= List of arches and bridges in Central Park =

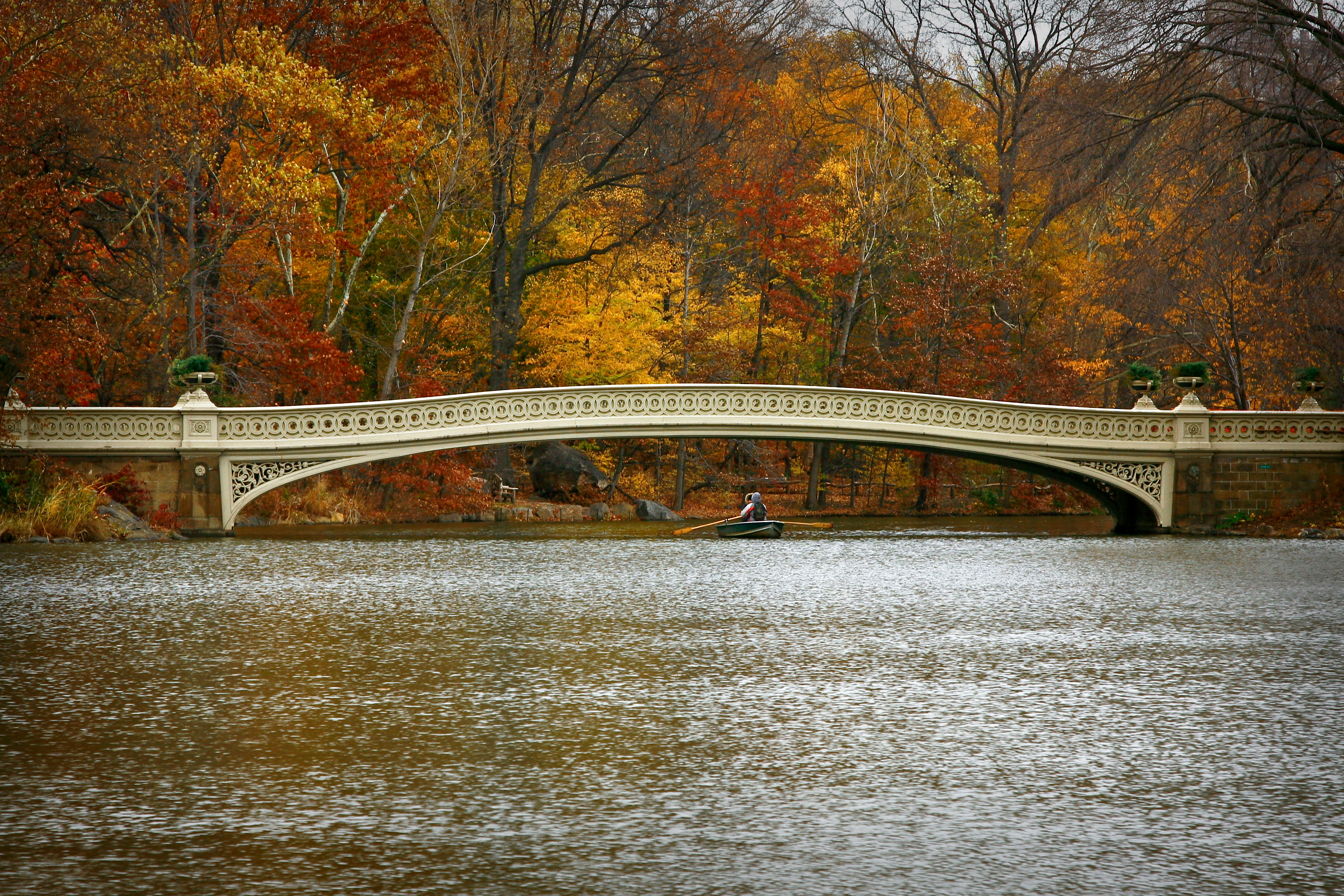
Bow Bridge (originally Bridge No. 5), which crosses the Lake in Central Park's southern section

Central Park in New York City has thirty-six ornamental spans, most of which were built in the 1860s as part of the park's construction. No two bridges in the park are alike. There were three types of bridges and arches constructed in Central Park. The spans across the sunken "transverse" roads that carry crosstown traffic below the park were made of natural-looking schist, and are generally not counted as arches or bridges. "Ornamental Bridges or Archways" were larger spans integrated into the greater landscape and were made of brick, stone, or cast iron. The final category, "rustic" bridges, were smaller stone or log bridges and usually spanned small walkways or streams. Central Park had 39 bridges at its peak.

The bridges were devised as part of Frederick Law Olmsted and Calvert Vaux's proposal for Central Park, the Greensward Plan. Most of the spans were built in the 1860s. By 1872, there were thirty-three spans; six more spans were built before the end of the 19th century. Three of the original 39 bridges were removed in the 1930s.

== Background ==
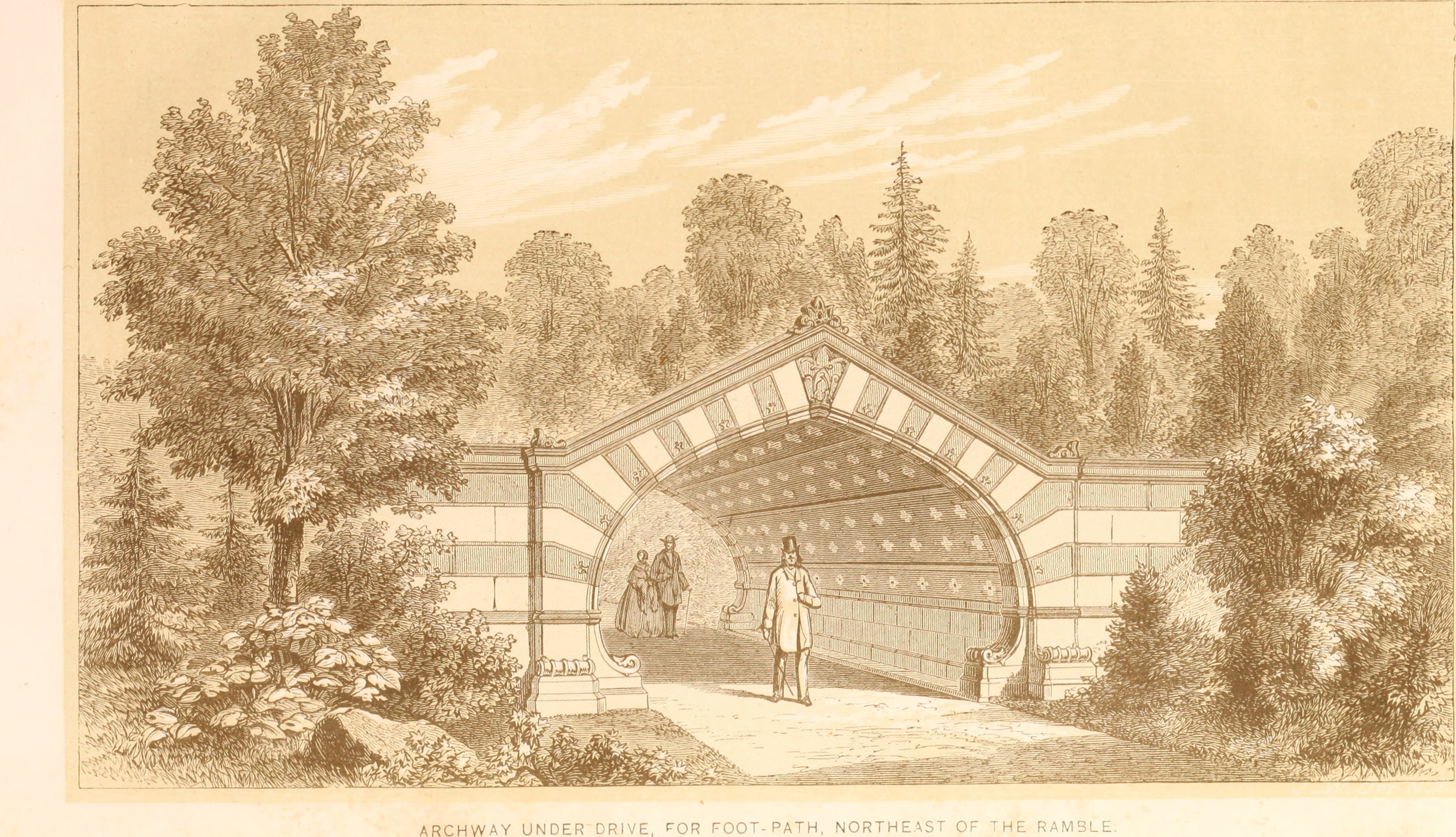
A sketch of a planned bridge from the Central Park commission's 1858 report

=== Development of Central Park ===
By the 1840s, members of the city's elite were publicly calling for the construction of a new large park in Manhattan. At the time, Manhattan's seventeen squares comprised a combined 165 acres (67 ha) of land, constituting less than one percent of Manhattan's total area. An initial bill to acquire Jones's Wood, a 160-acre (65 ha) tract of land on the Upper East Side, was nullified in 1851, and a subsequent bill to approve the purchase of Jones's Wood was also defeated in 1854. The second possible site for a large public park was a 750-acre (300 ha) area labeled Central Park, which was bounded by 59th and 106th Streets between Fifth and Eighth Avenues.

In July 1853, the New York State Legislature passed the Central Park Act, authorizing the purchase of the present-day site of Central Park. The initial plans for Central Park were devised by Egbert Ludovicus Viele, who had devised unofficial plans for the park in 1853. Viele's plan was disregarded by the Central Park commission, who started a landscape design contest in April 1857 to find a suitable design for the park.

=== Acceptance of Greensward Plan ===
Central Park superintendent Frederick Law Olmsted worked with Calvert Vaux to create the "Greensward Plan", which was eventually decided as the winner of the contest. The Greensward Plan distinguished itself from many of the other designs in the contest by including four sunken "transverse" roadways, which carried crosstown traffic through Central Park and were not intended to be seen or heard from the rest of the park. The transverse roadways were the most difficult to construct, as they were to run below the rest of the park, but engineer J. H. Pieper devised several designs for bridges and retaining walls for each roadway.

Along with the transverse roads, the plan envisioned three categories of park paths: "carriage" roadways for pleasure vehicles; bridle paths for horses; and pedestrian walkways. These paths would cross each other, necessitating bridges and arches interspersed through the park, each with unique designs ranging from rugged rock spans to Neo-Gothic cast iron. Many of the bridges would be designed by Vaux.

=== Bridge types ===
There were three types of bridges and arches constructed in Central Park. The spans across the sunken transverse roads were made of natural-looking schist, with vaults of brick underneath; these were not included in the final bridge count. The other two types of bridges concerned crossings between the different types of paths in Central Park. "Ornamental Bridges or Archways" were larger spans integrated into the greater landscape and were made of brick, stone, or iron. Seven of the "ornamental" spans were made of iron; all except one of these bridges spanned bridle paths, the exception being the Bow Bridge, which spanned the Lake.

"Rustic" bridges were smaller and usually spanned small walkways or streams. There were six "rustic" wooden spans, as well as two stone spans (the Ramble and Riftstone Arches) that were sometimes considered to be rustic spans. Vaux and Jacob Wrey Mould made decisions on which materials to use in the spans. Vaux preferred to use bluestone, or brick mixed with granite and brownstone.

Initially, the bridges were all given numbers, mostly in the order that they were to be constructed. Most of the spans, except for the Bow Bridge, were designed to blend in with the surrounding environment, because Olmsted and Vaux wanted to maintain a pastoral ambiance within the park.

=== Construction ===
The initial plans called for seven bridges and two tunnels, as well as one masonry bridge and one footbridge. This number was later expanded to nineteen bridges, then to thirty-four and finally to thirty-nine. Most of the bridges were erected in the 1860s, during the initial construction of Central Park. The first spans were completed in 1859 and were mostly concentrated in the southern section of Central Park. Twenty-three bridges were completed before 1861, and eleven were completed from 1862 to 1865. Controversy arose in 1859 after it was found that the construction of Central Park had significant cost overrun, and the commissioners expressed concerns about the cost of the bridges' stone. This led to the approval of the "rustic" bridges in the northern section of Central Park.

By 1872, there were thirty-three spans. Inscope Arch, along with the original Gapstow Bridge and the now-demolished Outset Arch, were built in 1873 to alleviate traffic congestion. The three spans were built as per the suggestion of Olmsted and Vaux's landscape firm, which was no longer associated with Central Park at the time. Claremont and Mountcliff Arches, as well as Eagledale Bridge, were finished in 1890. The wooden Gapstow Bridge was replaced with a stone span in 1896. Of the thirty-nine arches and bridges that were ultimately built, thirty-five were designed by Vaux and Mould. Three spans were demolished in the 1930s: the Marble Arch, the Spur Rock Arch, and the Outset Arch.

== Arches ==
The width of the arch refers to the distance between abutments that form the walls of the vault underneath, and the length of the arch is the distance between the openings at either end of the vault. The length of the span refers to the distance between the two ends of the deck running overhead, and the width of the span is the same as the length of the arch. Bridges are designed by Calvert Vaux unless otherwise indicated. The arches and bridges are referred to by their names first, then the numbers originally assigned to them. The following listing excludes transverse arches and bridges, which do not count as ornamental spans.

| Name | No. | Image | Location | Built | Carries | Across | Vault length | Vault width | Vault height | Notes |
|---|---|---|---|---|---|---|---|---|---|---|
| Claremont Arch | —N/a | | near Central Park West and 90th Street; 40°47′16″N 73°58′01″W | 1890 | Ramp to West Drive | Pedestrian path | 58 feet (18 m) | 9 feet 4 inches (2.84 m) | 8 feet (2.4 m) | Claremont Arch is named after the former Claremont Riding Academy at 175 West 89th Street, the last remaining stable near Central Park before it closed in 2007. The span and parapet walls are made of Manhattan schist in ashlar. |
| Dalehead Arch | 6 | | near 64th Street; 40°46′15″N 73°58′43″W | 1860 | West Drive | Bridle path | 80 feet (24 m) | 24 feet (7.3 m) | 11 feet (3.4 m) | Dalehead Arch is made of sandstone with a brownstone ring molding around it and ornate carvings in its spandrels. |
| Denesmouth Arch | 7 | | near the Arsenal; 40°46′07″N 73°58′15″W | 1860 | 65th Street transverse | Pedestrian path | | 37 feet 3 inches (11.35 m) | 14 feet (4.3 m) | Denesmouth Arch, one of Central Park's thirteen original masonry bridges, is made entirely of New Brunswick sandstone. It is the only decorated arch in Central Park that carries a transverse roadway. Denesmouth Arch's balustrades, designed with Gothic-style quatrefoils, originally contained four elegant bronze street lights; three were removed because of vandalism, and the fourth was placed into storage. |
| Driprock Arch | 2 | | between 62nd and 63rd Streets near Wollman Rink and Heckscher Playground; 40°46′6.7″N 73°58′32.3″W | 1859 | Center Drive | Pedestrian path | 24 feet (7.3 m) | 65 feet (20 m) | 11 feet (3.4 m) | Driprock Arch carries Center Drive over what was formerly a bridle path, and before that, the former course of a mill stream that ran into what is now the Pond. The bridle path was demolished in the 1930s when Heckscher Playground was expanded, and a pedestrian path now passes underneath Driprock Arch. The arch contains a red-brick vault, spandrels, and revetments, as well as sandstone trim. There are sandstone rosaries set into the vault's ceiling. |
| Dipway Arch | 16 | | near Artisans' Gate at Central Park South and 7th Avenue; 40°46.05′0″N 73°58.68′0″W | 1860 | South Drive | Pedestrian path | | 15 feet 6 inches (4.72 m) | 11 feet 7 inches (3.53 m) | Dipway Arch has curved blue-gray granite, set in ashlar, along the abutments. The vault is lined with red brick and divided into a seven-arched arcade with keystones in each arch. The span overhead still has its original cast-iron railings. |
| Eaglevale Bridge/West 77th Street Arch | —N/a | | near Naturalists' Gate at 77th Street and Central Park West; 40°46′45.5″N 73°58′24″W | 1890 | Ramp to West Drive | Bridle and pedestrian path | 36 feet (11 m) | 31 feet (9.4 m) west arch, 33 feet 6 inches (10.21 m) east arch | 13 feet 6 inches (4.11 m) west arch, 18 feet (5.5 m) east arch | Eaglevale Bridge is the only double-arch bridge in Central Park. A pedestrian walkway, formerly a branch of the Lake leading to the Ladies' Pond, runs under the eastern arch, while a bridle path runs under the western arch. The bridge is revetted in gneiss and ashlar, and on both sides of the deck, there are balconies on the abutment between the two arches. The span is 150 feet (46 m) long and 36 feet (11 m) wide; the western arch is 13 feet 6 inches (4.11 m) tall and the eastern arch is 18 feet (5.5 m) wide. |
| Gapstow Bridge | 35 | | Northwest of Grand Army Plaza at Fifth Avenue and 59th Street; 40°46′1″N 73°58′25.5″W | 1896 | Pedestrian path | The Pond | 44 feet (13 m) | 76 feet (23 m) | 12 feet (3.7 m) | The current schist structure was built in 1896 by Howard & Caudwell. |
| Glade Arch | 8 | | near Fifth Avenue and 78th Street; 40°46′35.3″N 73°57′56.3″W | 1862 | Pedestrian path | Pedestrian path | 50 feet 7 inches (15.42 m) | 29 feet 6 inches (8.99 m) | 10 feet (3.0 m) | Glade Arch carries a former carriage path across a pedestrian walkway that leads to the corner of Fifth Avenue and 79th Street. The carriage path was converted into a pedestrian path in the early 20th century. Glade Arch is made entirely of New Brunswick sandstone. The balustrades of the deck are 95 feet (29 m) long. The vault is lined with brick and the abutments are revetted with ashlar. The bridge was renovated in 1981 after the northern balustrade was damaged by a snowplow the previous year. |
| Glen Span | 26 | | near Central Park West and 102nd Street, adjacent to the Loch; 40°47′41″N 73°57′33″W | 1865 | West Drive | Pedestrian path and the Loch | 50 feet (15 m) | 16 feet (4.9 m) | 18 feet 6 inches (5.64 m) | Glen Span is a light-gray gneiss-and-ashlar span across a stream called the Loch, as well as the adjacent walkway. It was originally envisioned as a wooden trestle. The wooden superstructure was built along with the bridge and replaced with stone in 1885. The sidewalls above are 65 feet (20 m) long. The face of the arch is surrounded by pentagonal voussoirs. There are two wide decorative grottos, one on each side of the arch; the northern grotto is deeper than the southern one. |
| Greengap Arch | 11 | | near the Central Park Zoo at around 63rd Street; 40°46′4.5″N 73°58′23.6″W | 1861 | East Drive | Bridle path | 81 feet (25 m) | 25 feet (7.6 m) | 13.25 feet (4.04 m) | Greengap Arch is made of Alberta sandstone. The span was restored in 1988 with the renovation of the Central Park Zoo. It is the only span in the park that is closed to the public. |
| Greyshot Arch | 13 | | near Merchants' Gate at Columbus Circle; 40°46.154′0″N 73°58.790′0″W | 1862 | West Drive | Pedestrian path | 80 feet (24 m) | 30 feet 6 inches (9.30 m) | 10 feet 1 inch (3.07 m) | Greyshot Arch is 80 feet (24 m) wide and contains a 100-foot-long (30 m) balustrade made of sandstone and decorated with fleur-de-lis. The arch is faced with gray-white gneiss from Westchester County. The vault is lined with Philadelphia brick. |
| Greywacke Arch | 23 | | near 79th Street and Fifth Avenue behind the Met; 40°46′44.7″N 73°57′56″W | c. 1862-63 | East Drive | Pedestrian path | 56 feet (17 m) | 18 feet 3 inches (5.56 m) | 11 feet 3 inches (3.43 m) | Greywacke Arch is a "Saracenic" pointed arch whose apex is in the center. The vault is 11 feet 3 inches (3.43 m) tall, 18-foot-3-inch (5.56 m) wide, and 56 feet (17 m) long. The exterior of Greywacke Arch is lined with grey Manhattan sandstone, greywacke from the Hudson Valley, and brownstone from Passaic, New Jersey. The inside of the vault is lined with bricks, mostly red with some white interspersed. After a period of neglect, Greywacke Arch was restored in 1985. |
| Huddlestone Arch | 29 | | near Farmers' Gate south of Lenox Avenue and 110th Street; 40°47′44.7″N 73°57′20″W | 1866 | East Drive | Pedestrian path and the Loch | | 22 feet (6.7 m) | 10 feet (3.0 m) | Huddlestone Arch carries the East Drive above a pedestrian path and the Loch. It is made of boulders, some weighing nearly 100 short tons (89 long tons), and is unique in that the boulders are held together solely by gravity. The vault is 10 feet (3.0 m) high and 22 feet (6.7 m) wide. |
| Inscope Arch | 33 | | near the Central Park Zoo at around 62nd Street; 40°46′0″N 73°58′22″W | 1873 | East Drive | Pedestrian path | 34 feet (10 m) | 13 feet 7 inches (4.14 m) | 12 feet (3.7 m) | Inscope Arch was built to reduce conflicts between pedestrian and vehicle traffic. Inscope Arch's vault is 12 feet (3.7 m) tall, 13 feet 7 inches (4.14 m) wide, and 34 feet (10 m) long, with a 100-foot-long (30 m) overhead railing. The ovoid, Tuscan style archway is faced with pink and gray granite, and surrounded by a cornice above. Inscope Arch was restored in the 1970s and again beginning in 2000. |
| Mountcliff/110th Street Arch | —N/a | | near Frederick Douglass Circle; 40°48′0″N 73°57′28.4″W | 1890 | Ramp to West Drive | Pedestrian path | | 21 feet (6.4 m) | 16 feet (4.9 m) | Mountcliff Arch is made of gneiss and ashlar. The span itself measures 102 feet (31 m) long, and is 48 feet (15 m) high, taller than any other span in the park. |
| Playmates Arch | 14 | | near 65th Street between the Dairy and the Carousel; 40°46′10.3″N 73°58′29″W | 1863 | Center Drive | Pedestrian path | 66 feet (20 m) | 17 feet 8 inches (5.38 m) | 9 feet 11 inches (3.02 m) | Playmates Arch is so named because the walkway underneath connects two children's play areas, the Dairy and the Carousel. Playmates Arch contains tricolored bands of red Philadelphia brick, yellow Milwaukee brick, and granite. The span overhead still has its original eastern cast-iron railing, but the western railing was replaced in 1989. |
| Ramble Arch | 20 | | The Ramble; 40°46′42″N 73°58′16.7″W | c. 1862-63 | Pedestrian path | Pedestrian path | | 5 feet (1.5 m) | 13 feet 6 inches (4.11 m) | Ramble Arch carries one pedestrian walkway over another, and is made of rockface ashlar. The pathway atop the span is 9 feet (2.7 m) long and contains rockface sidewalls that are 32 feet (9.8 m) long. Directly under or next to the arch was an entrance to the Cave, a feature that was sealed in the 1920s. |
| Riftstone Arch | 18 | | near Strawberry Fields at Central Park West and 72nd Street; 40°46′34″N 73°58′32″W | 1862 | Ramp to West Drive | Bridle path | | 30 feet (9.1 m) | 11 feet 10 inches (3.61 m) | Riftstone Arch is almost entirely hidden due to its being lower than the terrain around it. The span is made of Manhattan schist, extracted from rock outcroppings mined during the park's construction, and uses very little mortar to hold the rocks together. The abutments are hidden by various flora. It was originally classified as a "rustic bridge" because of its austere design. |
| Springbanks Arch | 25 | | North Meadow at 102nd Street latitude 40°47′37″N 73°57′29″W | 1863 | Bridle path | Pedestrian path and spring | 71 feet (22 m) | 17 feet 5 inches (5.31 m) | 9 feet 2 inches (2.79 m) | Springbanks Arch carries a bridle path and a former segment of carriage road across a pedestrian path, though there is a small flight of steps leading up from the southern end of the underpass. Springbanks Arch's exterior is faced with stone with an entablature on top, while the inside of the vault is lined with red brick. The southern side of the deck contains a cast-iron railing that is 50 feet 8 inches (15.44 m) long. A hidden spring is also located under the arch, and drains into the nearby Loch. |
| Trefoil Arch | 12 | | near Fifth Avenue and 73rd Street; 40°46′28″N 73°58′8″W | 1862 | East Drive | Pedestrian path | 15 feet 10 inches (4.83 m) | 15 feet 10 inches (4.83 m) | 11 feet 9 inches (3.58 m) | Trefoil Arch's eastern archway is distinguished by its trefoil (three-leafed) shape, constructed in the Gothic style. The western archway is round and is surrounded by rusticated voussoirs. The southern side of the deck contains a cast-iron railing that is 50 feet 8 inches (15.44 m) long. The arch received a renovation from 1983 to 1985. |
| Willowdell Arch | 3 | | near Fifth Avenue and 67th Street, next to the statue of Balto the dog 40°46′12″N 73°58′16.4″W | 1861 | East Drive | Pedestrian path | 49 feet (15 m) | 14 feet 10 inches (4.52 m) | 9 feet 10 inches (3.00 m) | Willowdell Arch, a brick bridge, is faced with brick and contains a sandstone trim, like the Driprock Arch. It contains rusticated voussoirs and brick coffers in the vault. A fountain was once located in a niche on the northern wall of the vault. |
| Winterdale Arch | 17 | | near 81st Street and Central Park West; 40°46′54.6″N 73°58′9.8″W | 1862 | West Drive | Bridle and pedestrian path | | 45 feet 6 inches (13.87 m) | 12 feet 3 inches (3.73 m) | Winterdale Arch was named after the Winter Drive, now part of the West Drive. The archways have granite facings and ashlar sandstone moldings, and its vault contains Milwaukee white brick and Philadelphia red brick. The vault is wider than any of the park's other brick or stone bridges. The span was rebuilt in 1993, and its railings, removed in the 1940s, were restored. |

== Bridges ==
The length of the span refers to the distance between the two ends of the deck running overhead, and the width of the span is the distance between the sidewalls or handrails on either side of the deck. Where applicable, the width of the arch refers to the distance between abutments that form the walls of the vault underneath, while the length of the arch is the distance between the openings at either end of the vault. Bridges are designed by Calvert Vaux unless otherwise indicated. The arches and bridges are referred to by their names first, then the numbers originally assigned to them.

| Name | No. | Image | Location | Carries | Across | Built | Span width | Span length | Span height | Notes |
|---|---|---|---|---|---|---|---|---|---|---|
| Balcony Bridge | 4 | | near Central Park West and 77th Street; 40°46′43.2″N 73°58′20.9″W | West Drive | A strait of the Lake | 1860 | 65 feet (20 m) | 27 feet (8.2 m) | 11 feet 6 inches (3.51 m) | Balcony Bridge is made of Manhattan schist and Hudson Valley greywacke, with a sandstone and cast-stone railing adorned with a quatrefoil pattern. The strait underneath formerly connected the Lake and the Ladies' Pond, but was infilled in the 1930s. The deck has an eastern sidewalk measuring 12 feet (3.7 m) wide and 65 feet (20 m) long. There are two small bays that jut out from the eastern side of the deck and contain stone benches. Balcony Bridge and Trefoil Arch are the only two bridges with asymmetric archways, as the western side of the deck does not contain bays. |
| Bow Bridge | 5 | | The Lake; 40°46′33″N 73°58′18.6″W | Pedestrian path | The Lake | 1862 | 15 feet 8 inches (4.78 m) | 87 feet (27 m) | 9 feet 6 inches (2.90 m) | Bow Bridge is decorated with a banister that contains interlocking circles, with eight planting urns on top of decorative bas-relief panels. Intricate arabesque elements and volutes can be seen in the arch underneath. Its 87-foot-long (27 m) span is the longest of any bridge in the park, though the balustrade is 142 feet (43 m) long. Bow Bridge was restored in 1974. |
| Oak/Cabinet/Bank Rock Bridge | 10 | | near West Drive at 77th Street latitude 40°46′43.3″N 73°58′18″W | Pedestrian path | Bank Rock Bay | 1860 | 16 feet (4.9 m) | 60 feet (18 m) | 6 feet 5 inches (1.96 m) | This bridge has been known by several names through its history, including Oak Bridge, Cabinet Bridge, and Bank Rock Bridge. It crosses Bank Rock Bay, a strait of the Lake, and for this reason is also called Bank Rock Bridge. The original structure was a wooden trestle made of yellow pine upon stone abutments. After a period of decline, Bank Rock Bridge was completely replaced in 1935, and again in 1982 and 2009. The abutments are the only holdovers from the original span. The railings of the current span are made of cast-iron panels between wooden posts. |
| Pine Bank Bridge | 15 | | near 62nd Street and Central Park West; 40°46′9.1″N 73°58′44″W | Pedestrian path | Bridle path | 1861 | 16 feet (4.9 m) | | 11 feet (3.4 m) | Pine Bank Bridge is made of cast iron, painted white, and contains a Gothic handrail. It was one of three such bridges across the bridle path; the other two spans were eliminated in the 1930s. Pine Bank Bridge was renovated in 1984 after a period of neglect and extensive rust, and its original concrete deck was replaced with the current wooden deck. |
| Terrace Bridge | 1 | | Bethesda Terrace; 40°46′25.6″N 73°58′15.7″W | Terrace Drive | Pedestrian plaza | 1863 | 45 feet (14 m) | 29 feet (8.8 m) | 16 feet (4.9 m) | Terrace Bridge is located outside Bethesda Terrace and Fountain and was completed in 1863. The upper terrace carries Center Drive from west to east and is supported by a seven-arched Arcade underneath. Steps to the north lead downstairs to the lower terrace, while steps to the south connect the lower and upper terraces with the Central Park Mall. The upper deck is supported by 24-inch-deep (61 cm) iron girders set 6 feet 11.25 inches (211.46 cm) apart. |
| Unnamed Gothic bridge | 28 | | North of Jacqueline Kennedy Onassis Reservoir; 40°47′20″N 73°57′43.3″W | Pedestrian path | Bridle path | 1864 | 11 feet 7 inches (3.53 m) | 37 feet 5 inches (11.40 m) | 15 feet 3 inches (4.65 m) | The unnamed Gothic-style bridge, officially Bridge No. 28, is the first of three cast-iron bridges surrounding the Jacqueline Kennedy Onassis Reservoir. J.B. & W.W. Cornell Ironworks manufactured the bridge. The ornate oval-shaped arch's handrails are 93 feet (28 m) long. The span was rehabilitated in 1981. |
| Unnamed bridge at Southeast Reservoir | 24 | | near Fifth Avenue and 85th Street; 40°46′54.8″N 73°57′45.6″W | Pedestrian path | Bridle path | 1864 | | 33 feet (10 m) | 10 feet 3 inches (3.12 m) | The unnamed bridge, officially Bridge No. 24, is the second of three cast-iron bridges surrounding the Jacqueline Kennedy Onassis Reservoir. J.B. & W.W. Cornell Ironworks manufactured the bridge. Unlike the other cast-iron bridges around the Reservoir, the deck of Bridge No. 24 is flat. The span was renovated in 1989 and 2012. |
| Unnamed bridge at Southwest Reservoir | 27 | | near Central Park West and 94th Street; 40°47′4″N 73°57′58.4″W | Pedestrian path | Bridle path | 1864 | | 38 feet 2 inches (11.63 m) | 10 feet 9 inches (3.28 m) | The unnamed bridge, officially Bridge No. 27, is the third of three cast-iron bridges surrounding the Jacqueline Kennedy Onassis Reservoir. It contains floral scrolls in its spandrels and handrails. The span was restored in 1979. |

=== Rustic bridges ===
There are also eight "rustic" bridges in Central Park, the majority of which were made of unpainted timber. Riftstone and Ramble Arches are excluded from this list, as they are already classified as arches. The other six rustic bridges are all wooden.

| Name | No. | Image | Location | Carries | Across | Built | Notes |
|---|---|---|---|---|---|---|---|
| Cascade Bridge | 30 | | North Meadow; 40°47′39″N 73°57′28″W | Pedestrian path | The Loch | c. late 1860s | Cascade Bridge, a wooden bridge, crosses the Ravine (near the Loch) east of Glen Rock Span. |
| Gill Bridge | 21 | | The Ramble; 40°46′38.8″N 73°58′16.1″W | Pedestrian path | The Gill, a stream of the Lake | 1860 | Gill Bridge, a wooden bridge, was rebuilt multiple times in its history, and is distinguished by wooden railings that contort near the abutments. |
| Loch Bridge | 32 | | The Pool; 40°47′41.2″N 73°57′34.6″W | Pedestrian path | The Loch | c. late 1860s | Loch Bridge crosses the Loch west of Glen Rock Span, near the Pool. |
| Triplets Bridge | 22 | | near Central Park West and 77th Street; 40°46′45.3″N 73°58′21.4″W | Pedestrian path | Dried-up gulley of the Lake | 1860 | This formerly unnamed wooden bridge originally crossed the Ladies' Pond, which has been filled in. In 2000, it was dedicated the "Triplets Bridge", after Benjamin, Rachel and Justin Chasalow. |
| Unnamed | —N/a | | The Ramble; 40°46′38.9″N 73°58′14.9″W | Pedestrian Path | The Gill, a stream of the Lake | 1860 | This unnamed bridge is a wooden bridge in the Ramble. Unlike the Gill Bridge, its railings do not contort near the abutments. |
| Unnamed | 31 | | North Meadow; 40°47′40.9″N 73°57′29.8″W | Pedestrian path | The Loch | c. late 1860s | This unnamed wooden bridge crosses the Loch east of Glen Rock Span. |

== Former structures ==
| Name | No. | Image | Location | Carries | Across | Built | Demolished | Span width / vault length | Span length / vault width | Span height | Notes |
|---|---|---|---|---|---|---|---|---|---|---|---|
| Gapstow Bridge | 35 | | Northwest of Grand Army Plaza at Fifth Avenue and 59th Street; 40°46′1″N 73°58′25.5″W | Pedestrian path | The Pond | 1874 | 1896 | | | | The first Gapstow Bridge was a wooden bridge supported by segmental arches on either side of the deck, the tops of which rose above the deck, similar to the design of a through arch bridge. |
| Marble Arch | 9 | | 66th Street latitude 40°46′11″N 73°58′23″W | Center Drive | Pedestrian path | 1860 | 1938 | | | | Marble Arch was located at the southern end of the Mall, and was Central Park's only bridge made of marble. The vault underneath contained a fountain and benches. The arch was destroyed in 1938 when Center Drive was straightened. The remains of the arch are rumored to have remained in situ, being buried under the Mall. |
| Oval/Spur Rock Arch | 19 | | near 61st Street latitude 40°46′6″N 73°58′42″W | Pedestrian path | Bridle path | 1862 | 1934 | | 25 feet (7.6 m) | 12 feet 6 inches (3.81 m) | Spur Rock Arch was an oval-shaped arch close to the present-day Dipway Arch. A bridle path ran underneath the arch. While both abutments were embedded within the ground, one of the abutments rested against a "spur" of Manhattan schist. There were wheels within the spandrels. Spur Rock Arch contained wrought iron supports and fine cast-iron details. It was destroyed in 1934 when Heckscher Playground was expanded. |
| Outset Arch | 34 | | Central Park Zoo; 40°46′2″N 73°58′22″W | Pedestrian path | Bridle path | 1875 | 1934 | | 25 feet (7.6 m) | 12 feet 6 inches (3.81 m) | Outset Arch was an elaborate semi-elliptical arch. A bridle path ran underneath the arch. It was destroyed in 1934 when the Central Park Zoo was expanded. |
