= The Pond and Hallett Nature Sanctuary =

Geographical features in New York City's Central Park

Coordinates: 40.766361°N 73.974490°W

Notable buildings and structures of Central Park. Click on the map and then on the points for details.

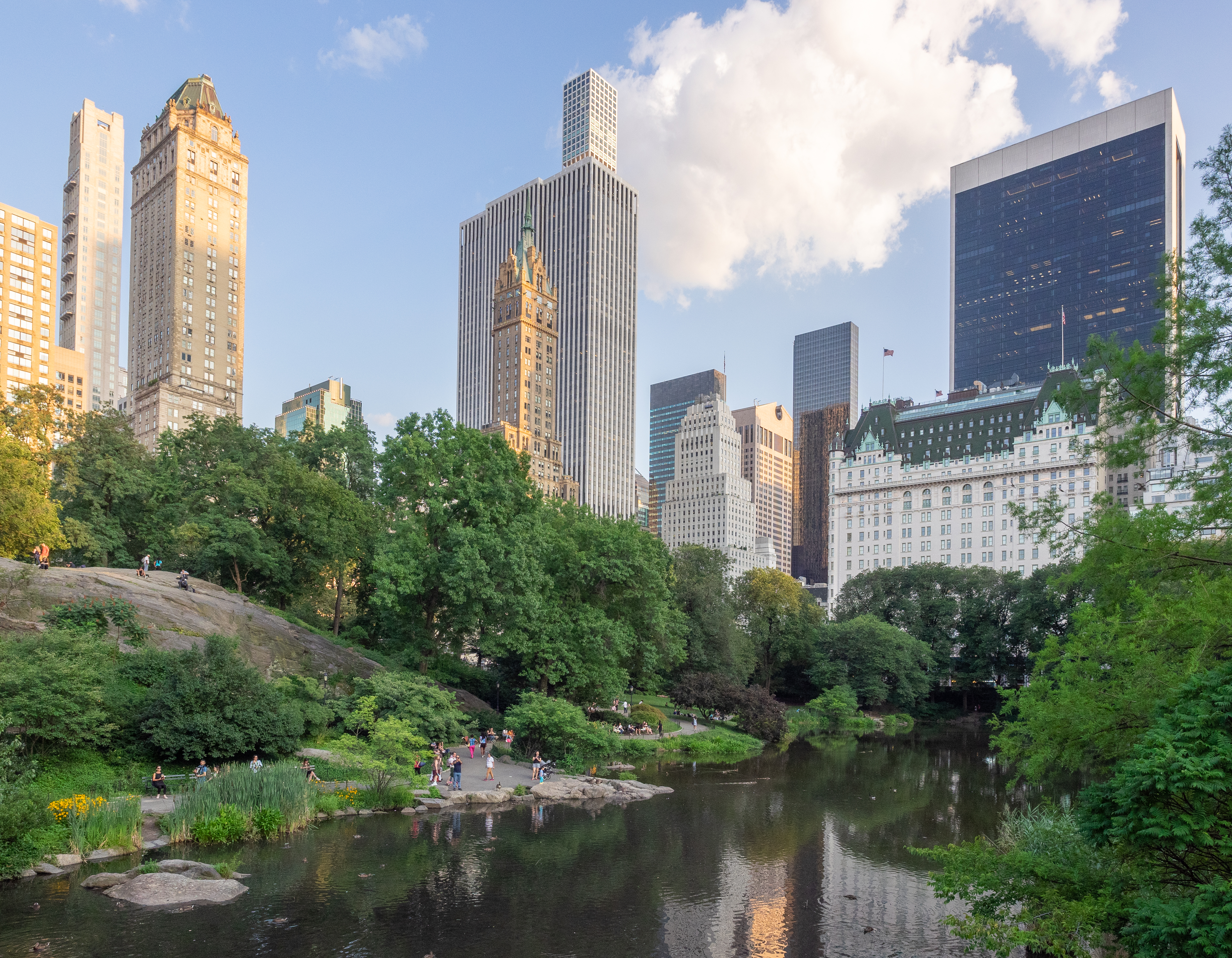
The Pond and Midtown Manhattan from Gapstow Bridge in 2019

The Pond and Hallett Nature Sanctuary are two connected features at the southeastern corner of Central Park in Manhattan, New York City. It is located near Grand Army Plaza, across Central Park South from the Plaza Hotel, and slightly west of Fifth Avenue. The Pond is one of seven bodies of water in Central Park.

== Hallett Sanctuary ==
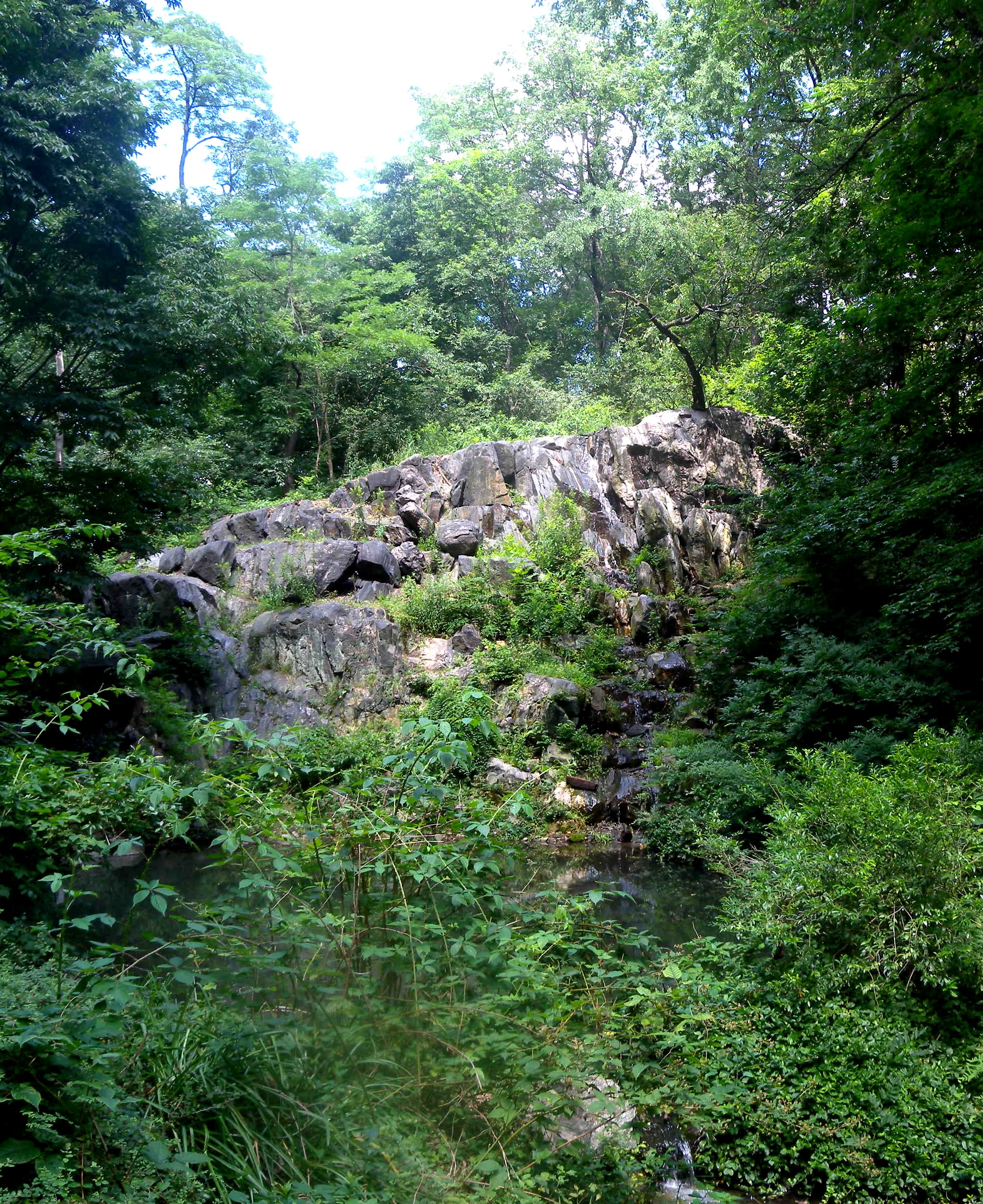
Water trickles down an artificial cascade into the pond.

The Hallett Nature Sanctuary is the smallest of Central Park's wooded areas at 4 acres (1.6 ha). Originally known as the Promontory, it is the only permanently fenced-off section of Central Park aside from Jacqueline Kennedy Onassis Reservoir, occupies 3.5 acres (14,000 m^{2}) of the wooded promontory to the west of the Pond, jutting into the water body. The area was closed in 1934 when NYC Parks commissioner Robert Moses set the site apart as a bird sanctuary. In the 1980s, after decades of neglect, invasive alien plants like ailanthus and Far Eastern wisterias were extirpated, and the equally invasive though native black cherry was thinned, the woodland was enriched with native shrubs. The reserve was renamed in 1986, in honor of George Hervey Hallett Jr. (1895–1985), an ardent birdwatcher and naturalist and executive secretary of the Citizens Union. The Hallett Sanctuary was reopened to the public in 2016, when the Central Park Conservancy started allowing visitors to enter the sanctuary during middays.

The Central Park Conservancy routinely offers half-hour tours; they avoid nesting season and the height of migratory season, because Central Park is a stopover on the Atlantic Flyway. The perimeter affords one of the prime bird watching areas of the Park. Formerly, deadfalls remained where they lay, to provide for insects that feed birds. However, the experiment ended after an Asian longhorn beetle was discovered in 2002. Another unexpected visitor was Hal the Central Park Coyote, who received his nickname from the Hallett Sanctuary and passed through briefly in March 2006.

== The Pond ==
As originally laid out by Frederick Law Olmsted and Calvert Vaux, the Pond was considerably larger. A large piece of its upper reaches, which once spanned a narrow neck of water, was paved over to form Wollman Rink, which opened in 1950. Nearby, on stone plinths, bronze busts commemorate the poet Thomas Moore and the composer Victor Herbert (by Edmond Thomas Quinn).

The Central Park Conservancy started a reconstruction of the Pond in 2000, and completed it the next year. The reconstruction included new shoreline and perimeter plantings, an island habitat for birds and turtles, and beyond Gapstow Bridge, a series of small pools and cascades. A male mandarin duck resident of the Pond, nicknamed Mandarin Patinkin, received international media attention in late 2018 and early 2019; the duck's colorful appearance and the species' appearance outside its native range in East Asia contributed to its popularity.

The Pond is spanned by Gapstow Bridge, a schist structure built in 1896 by Howard & Caudwell. It replaced an 1871 bridge by Jacob Wrey Mould. The first bridge was a wooden bridge supported by segmental arches on either side of the deck, the tops of which rose above the deck, similar to the design of a through arch bridge.
