= Bow Bridge (Central Park) =

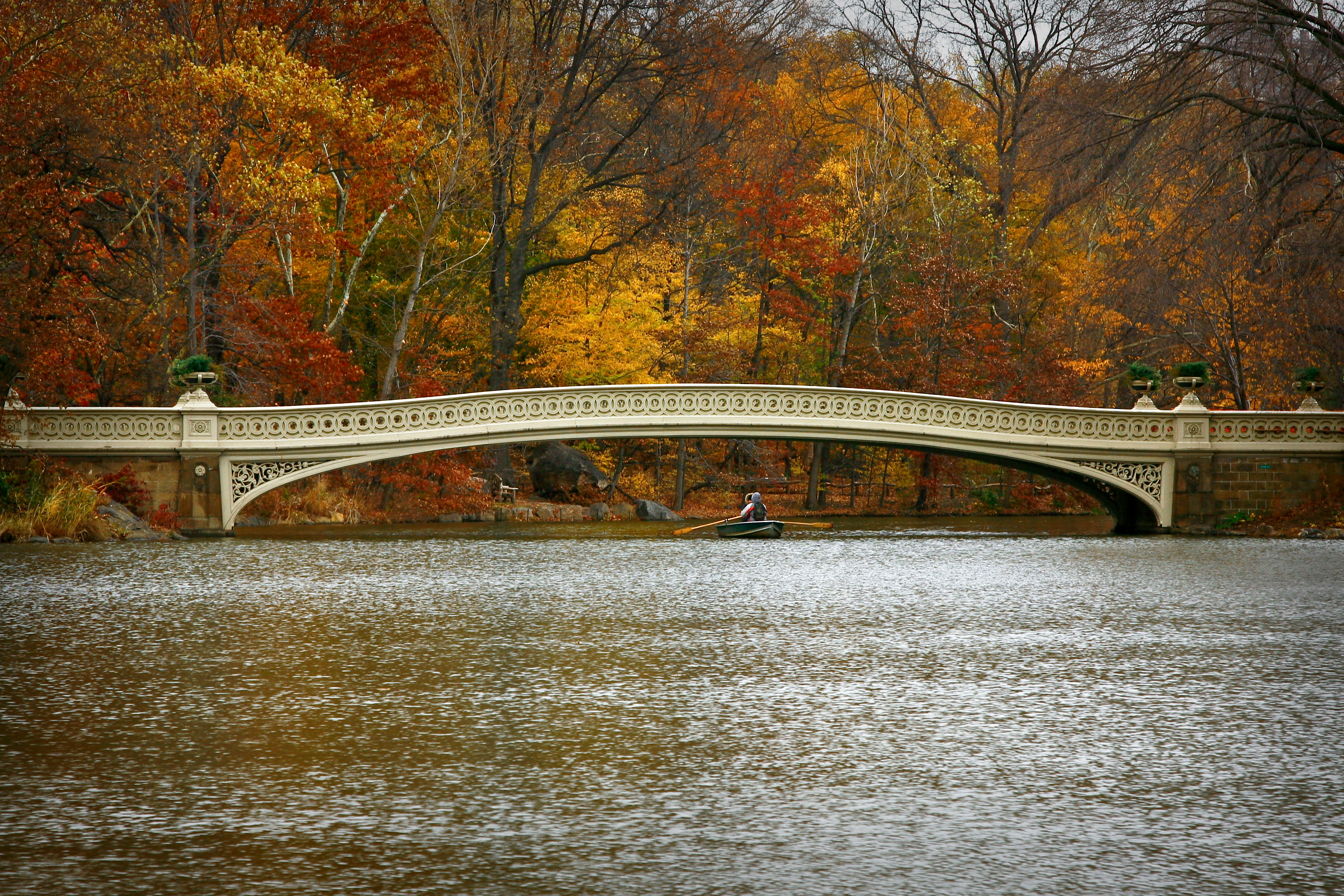
- Coordinates: 40°46′33″N 73°58′18.6″W
- Locale: The Ramble and Lake, Central Park

Characteristics
- Design: Classical Greek
- Material: Cast iron
- Total length: 87 feet (27 m)
- Longest span: 60 feet (18 m)
- No. of spans: 1

History
- Designer: Calvert Vaux and Jacob Wrey Mould
- Construction end: 1862

Statistics
- Daily traffic: Pedestrian

Location
- Interactive map of Bow Bridge

The Bow Bridge/ˈboʊ/ is a cast iron bridge located in Central Park, New York City, crossing over the Lake and used as a pedestrian walkway.

It is decorated with an interlocking circles banister, with eight planting urns on top of decorative bas-relief panels. Intricate arabesque elements and volutes can be seen underneath the span arch. Its 87-foot-long (27 m) span is the longest of the park's bridges, though the balustrade is 142 feet (43 m) long. While other bridges in Central Park are inconspicuous, the Bow Bridge is made to stand out from its surroundings. The Bow Bridge is also the only one of Central Park's seven ornamental iron bridges that does not traverse a bridle path.

The bridge was designed by Calvert Vaux and Jacob Wrey Mould, and completed in 1862. It was built by the Bronx-based iron foundry Janes, Kirtland & Co., the same company that constructed the dome of U.S. Capitol Building. The bridge was restored in 1974. The bridge was closed again in November 2023 for a two-month renovation.

== See also ==
- List of bridges documented by the Historic American Engineering Record in New York
