= The Ramble and Lake =

Geographical features in New York City's Central Park

Coordinates: 40°46′35″N 73°58′16″W

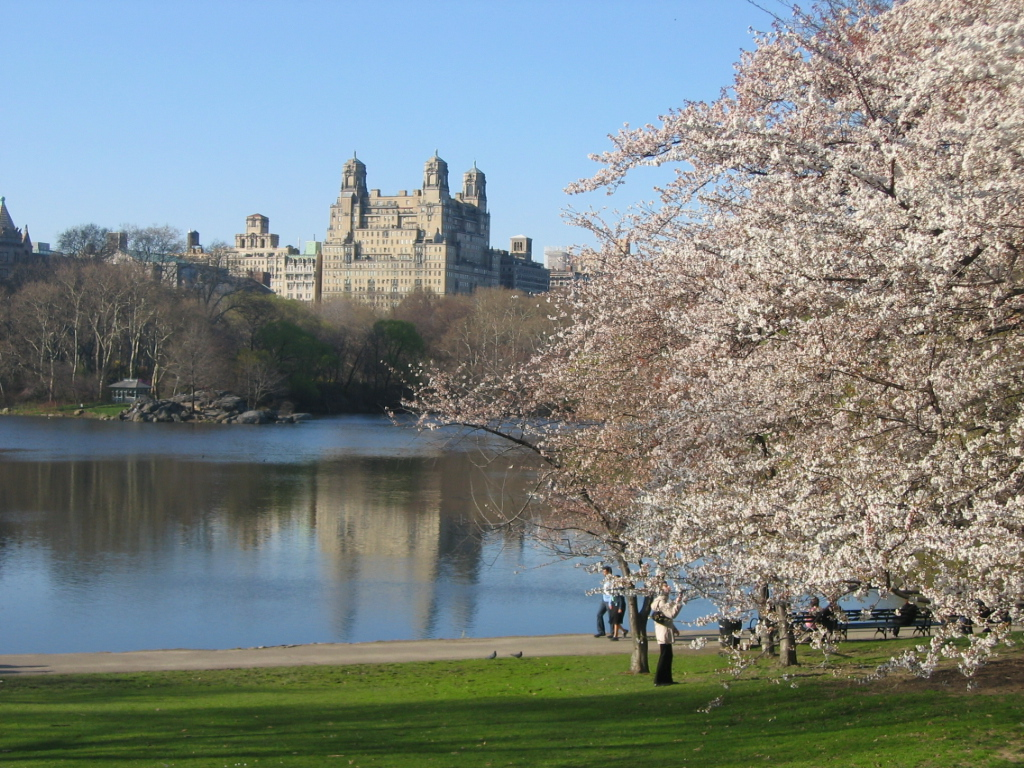
The Lake and the towers of The Beresford as seen from the Ramble

Notable buildings and structures of Central Park. Click on the map and then on the points for details.
'"`UNIQ--templatestyles-00000004-QINU`"''"`UNIQ--templatestyles-00000005-QINU`"'

The Ramble and Lake are two geographic features of Central Park in Manhattan, New York City. Part of Frederick Law Olmsted and Calvert Vaux's 1857 Greensward Plan for Central Park, the features are located on the west side of the park between the 66th and 79th Street transverses.

The 38-acre (15-hectare) Ramble, located on the north shore of the Lake, is a forested area with highly varied topography and numerous winding walks, designated by the New York City Department of Parks and Recreation as a protected nature preserve. It was designed as a "wild garden" away from carriage drives and bridle paths, in which to be wandered, or to be viewed as a "natural" landscape. The Ramble includes several rustic bridges, and formerly contained a small cave. Historically, it has been frequented for both birdwatching and cruising.

The serpentine 20-acre (8-hectare) Lake offers dense naturalistic planting, outcrops of glacially scarred Manhattan bedrock, small open glades, and an artificial stream (the Gill) that empties through the Azalea Pond, then down a cascade into the Lake. At the northwestern corner of the Lake, the ground rises toward Vista Rock, crowned by a lookout and folly named Belvedere Castle. The western shore includes the Ladies' Shelter, the southern shore contains a waterfront porch called Bethesda Terrace, and the eastern shore contains the Loeb Boathouse.

== Geography ==
=== Ramble ===
The Ramble is one of three main woodlands in Central Park, the others being North Woods and Hallett Nature Sanctuary. The Ramble covers 36 to 38 acres (14.5 to 15.5 hectares), and contains a series of winding paths, as well as outcrops, rustic structures, and several bridges. The Ramble is designated by the New York City Department of Parks and Recreation as a "Forever Wild" natural preserve, which prevents any future redevelopment of the site.

During construction, the park's most varied and intricately planted landscape was planted with native trees such as tupelo (Nyssa sylvatica); American sycamore; white, red, black, scarlet, and willow oaks; Hackberry; and Liriodendron. These trees were arranged to create a colorful tropical effect. These coexisted with some American trees never native to the area, such as Kentucky coffee tree, yellowwood, and cucumber magnolia, and a few exotics, such as Phellodendron and Sophora. Smaller natives include sassafras. Aggressively self-seeding black cherry and black locust later came to dominate the Ramble. A 1979 census of the Ramble's trees, taken by Bruce Kelly, Philip Winslow, and James Marston Fitch, found 6,000 trees, including 60 specimen trees of landscape value. The Ramble formerly had a tree that was decorated every year in memory of park visitors' deceased pets; the tree, a Chamaecyparis obtusa, was euthanized in 2025.

=== Lake and watercourses ===
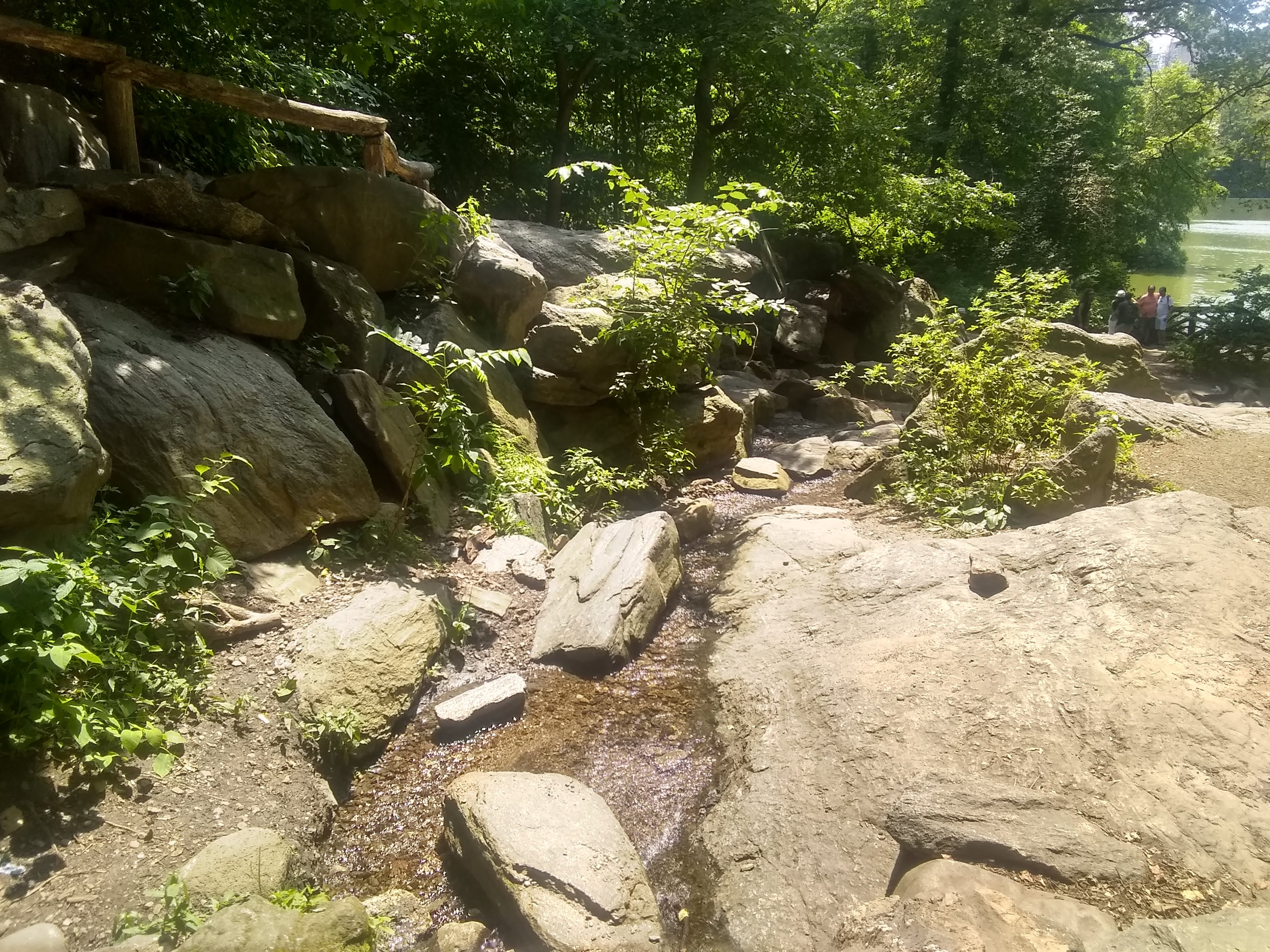
The Gill flows into the Lake

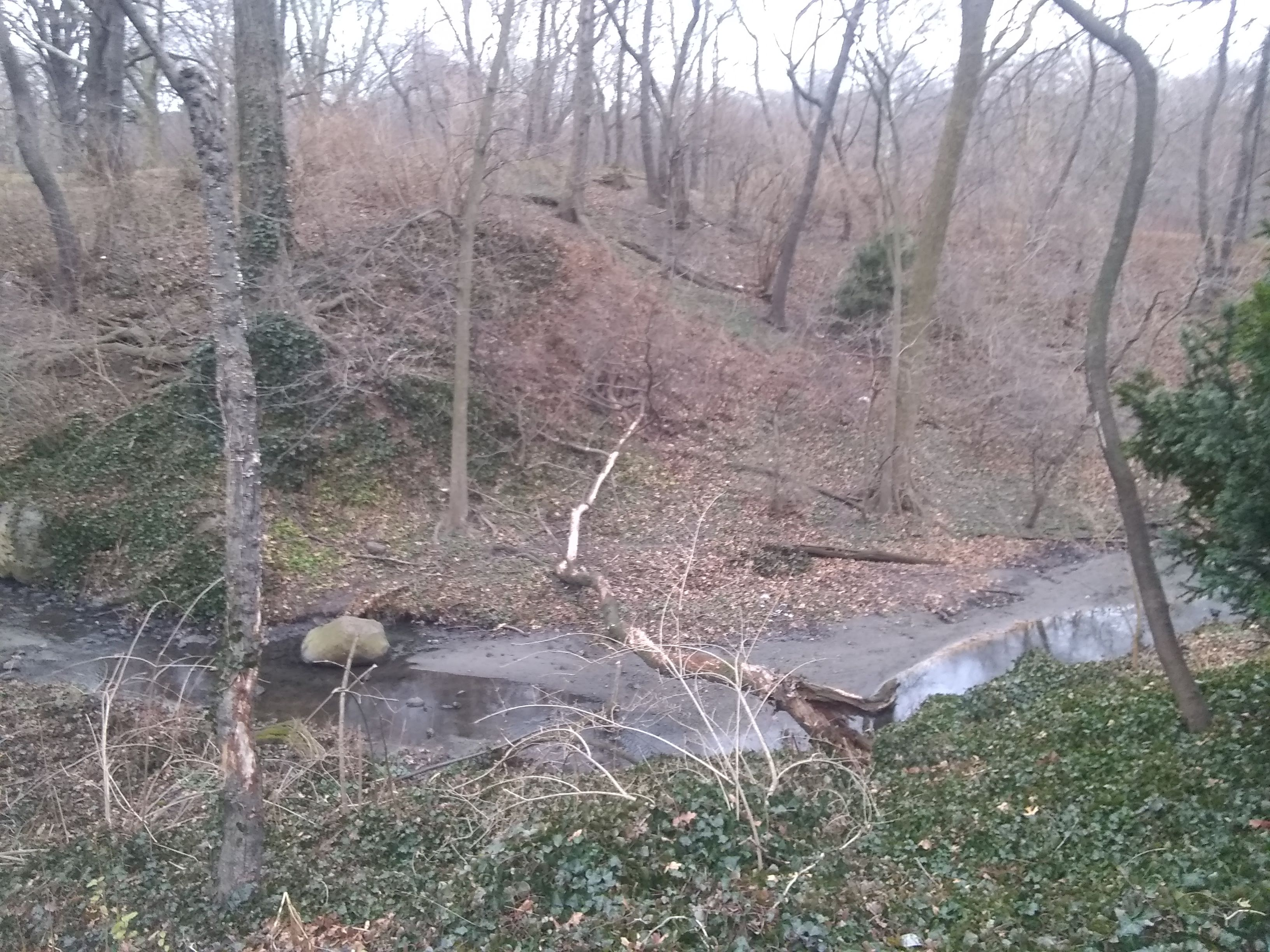
Remnant of the Ladies Pond, which once flowed into the Lake

The Lake, covering 20 acres (8 hectares), unified what Calvert Vaux called the "irregular disconnected featureless conglomeration of ground". It was excavated, entirely by hand, from unprepossessing swampy ground transected by drainage ditches and ramshackle stone walls. The Lake is connected to two additional watercourses. The Gill, adapted from the Scottish word for "stream", starts from a water pipe in the middle of the Ramble and flows southeast into Azalea Pond, a collecting pond adjacent to the Lake frequented by birdwatchers. In addition, an inlet called Bank Rock Bay extends off the extreme north end of the Lake.

The Ladies' Skating Pond once abutted the western side of the Lake. It was partially infilled due to malaria concerns in 1888, and it was completely drained by 1936. Today, the site of the Ladies' Pond is occupied by a lawn and dog walk that is much lower than the surrounding topography.

== Notable features ==
=== Bethesda Terrace and Fountain ===
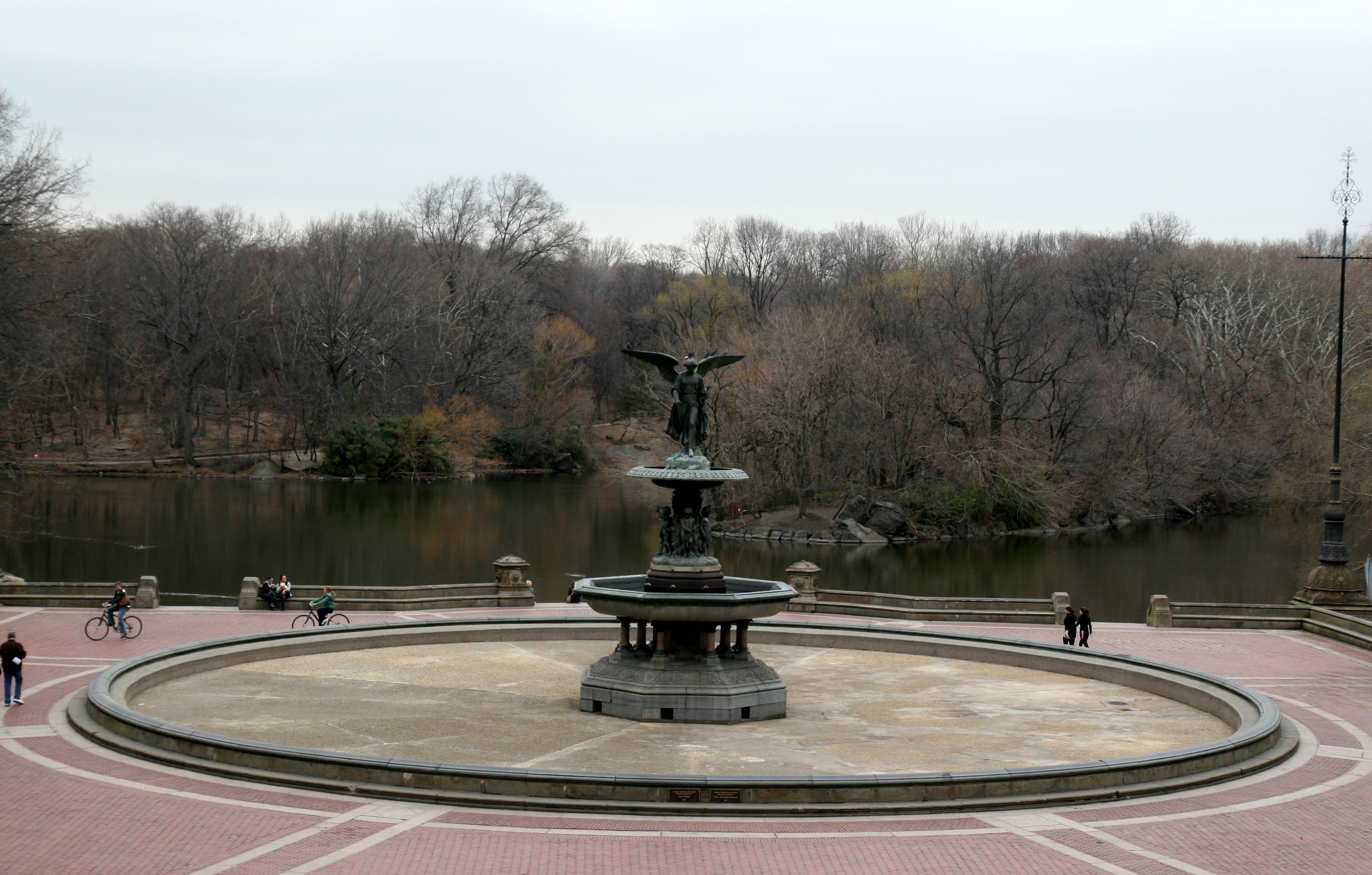
From Bethesda Fountain. The Lake forms the foreground to The Ramble beyond.

Bethesda Terrace and Fountain are located at the southeastern end of the Lake. They form the northern end of the Central Park Mall, the only formal feature in the park's original blueprint, the Greensward Plan. The terrace is composed of two levels, the lower of which houses the fountain. The center of the fountain contains the sculpture Angel of the Waters (1873) by Emma Stebbins, the first large public sculpture commission for an American woman.

=== Bridges ===
There are multiple bridges in the Ramble, including one across the Lake. Bow Bridge connects the Lake's southern shore with the Ramble, on the northern shore of the Lake. The span is notable for its intricate cast iron design. Its 87-foot-long (27 m) span is the longest of any bridge in the park, though the balustrade is 142 feet (43 m) long. Bow Bridge was restored in 1974.

The northern end of the Lake is spanned by a small bridge called Oak Bridge or Cabinet Bridge. It crosses Bank Rock Bay and for this reason is also called Bank Rock Bridge. The original structure was a wooden trestle made of yellow pine upon stone abutments. After a period of decline, the bridge was completely replaced in 1935, and again in 1982 and 2009. The abutments are the only holdovers from the original span. The railings of the current span are made of cast-iron panels between wooden posts.

There are also three smaller spans in the Ramble. One of them, the Ramble Arch, is a stone arch that carries one pedestrian walkway over another, and is made of rockface ashlar. Additionally, the Gill Bridge, a wooden bridge, crosses the Gill at its mouth. Another wooden bridge, unnamed, is located further upstream of the Gill.

=== Cave ===
A cave was originally located inside the Ramble, adjacent to Ramble Arch. It was not originally part of the Greensward Plan, but rather, was originally a narrow cavity uncovered after a deposit of fertile soil was excavated at the site. Olmsted and Vaux lined the entrance of the cavity with boulders and created a stone staircase down to the Cave.

The Ramble Cave, also known as Indian Cave, was a popular attraction. It was characterized as a romantic spot and as a play area for kids. A teenage runaway may have lived in the Cave for a month in the late 1890s. However, by the early 20th century, the Cave had become associated with crime. For instance, a suicide in the Cave occurred in 1904, and an alleged attempted robbery occurred in 1922. Some of the more than 300 men arrested in Central Park in 1929 for "annoying women" were apprehended in the Cave. By 1934, it was sealed off because of numerous reports of suicides, crimes, and homeless people.

=== Hernshead and Ladies' Pavilion ===
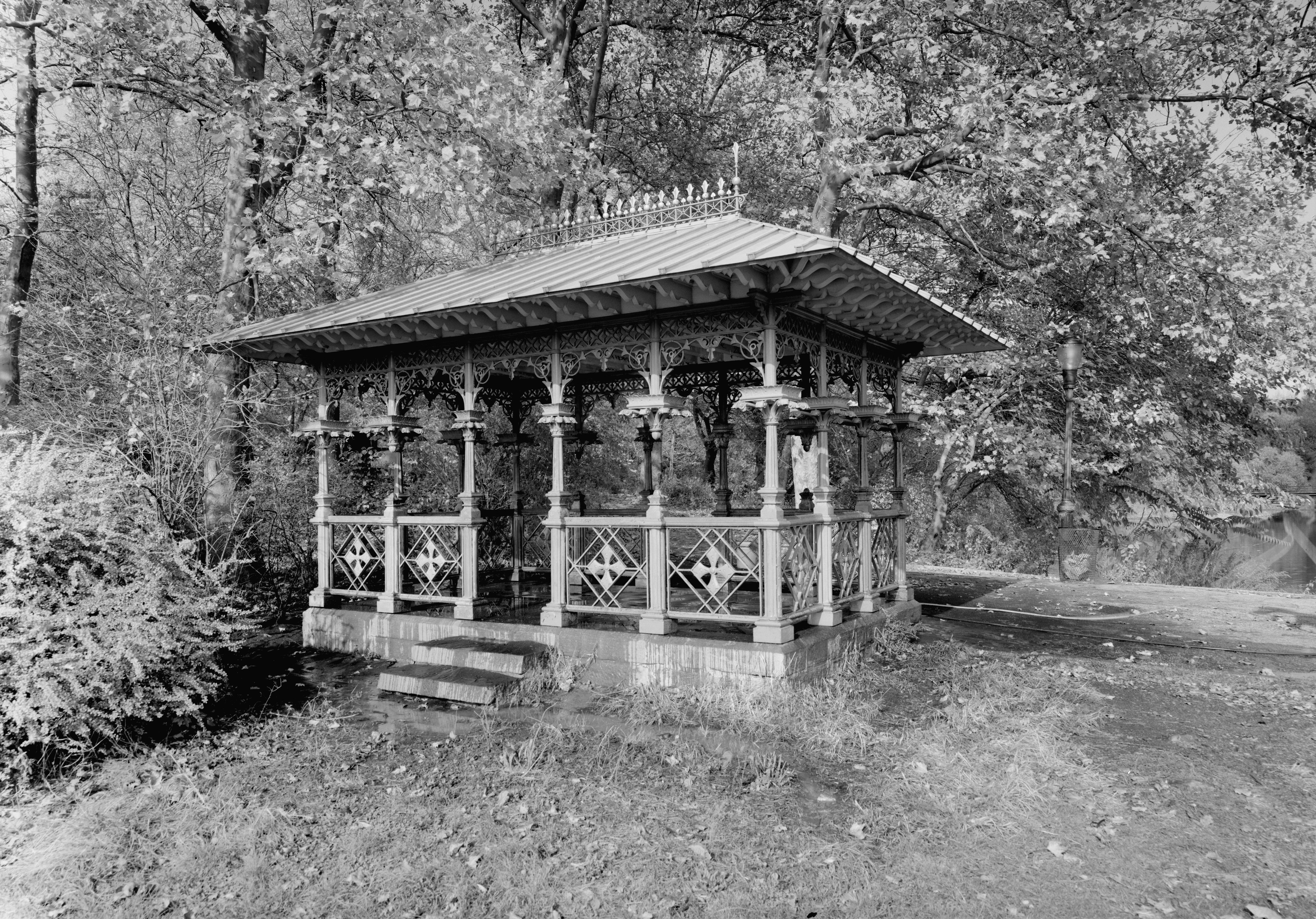
Ladies' Pavilion

The western shore of the Lake, between 75th and 77th Streets, contains a rocky promontory that Olmsted called the Hernshead. Translated to "heron's head", it is named because the outcrop is shaped roughly like a heron's head. The outcrop was restored in 1987. The Ladies Cottage was once located at the Hernshead. It was so named because it abutted the Ladies' Skating Pond, and might have been used as a gender-separated locker room for female skaters as early as 1860.

The Ladies' Pavilion, a wrought iron shelter in a playful Gothic style, was later relocated atop the Hernshead. Jacob Wrey Mould had designed the pavilion in 1871 as a shelter for people waiting to change streetcars at Columbus Circle in the southwest corner of the park. Though no drawings remain of the original Ladies' Pavilion, Mould designed a similar shelter at the southeast corner, on Fifth Avenue, between 1871 and 1872. When the USS Maine Monument was installed on the shelter's site, the cast-iron elements were disassembled and stored, to be re-erected on the Hernshead. The exact date of the pavilion's relocation is unclear: some accounts give a date of 1904, while others cite the 1930s. The Ladies' Pavilion declined over time due to rust and vandalism, and though individuals and groups advocated for the restoration of the Ladies' Pavilion, vandals destroyed the structure in 1971. The pavilion was partially rebuilt with some of its overhead panels in 1973, though the city deemed a full renovation to be too expensive, as it would have cost $95,000. Six years later, it was completely restored in a project funded with a $7,000 grant from the Arthur Ross Foundation and a $150,000 donation from a Japanese donor.

=== Loeb Boathouse ===
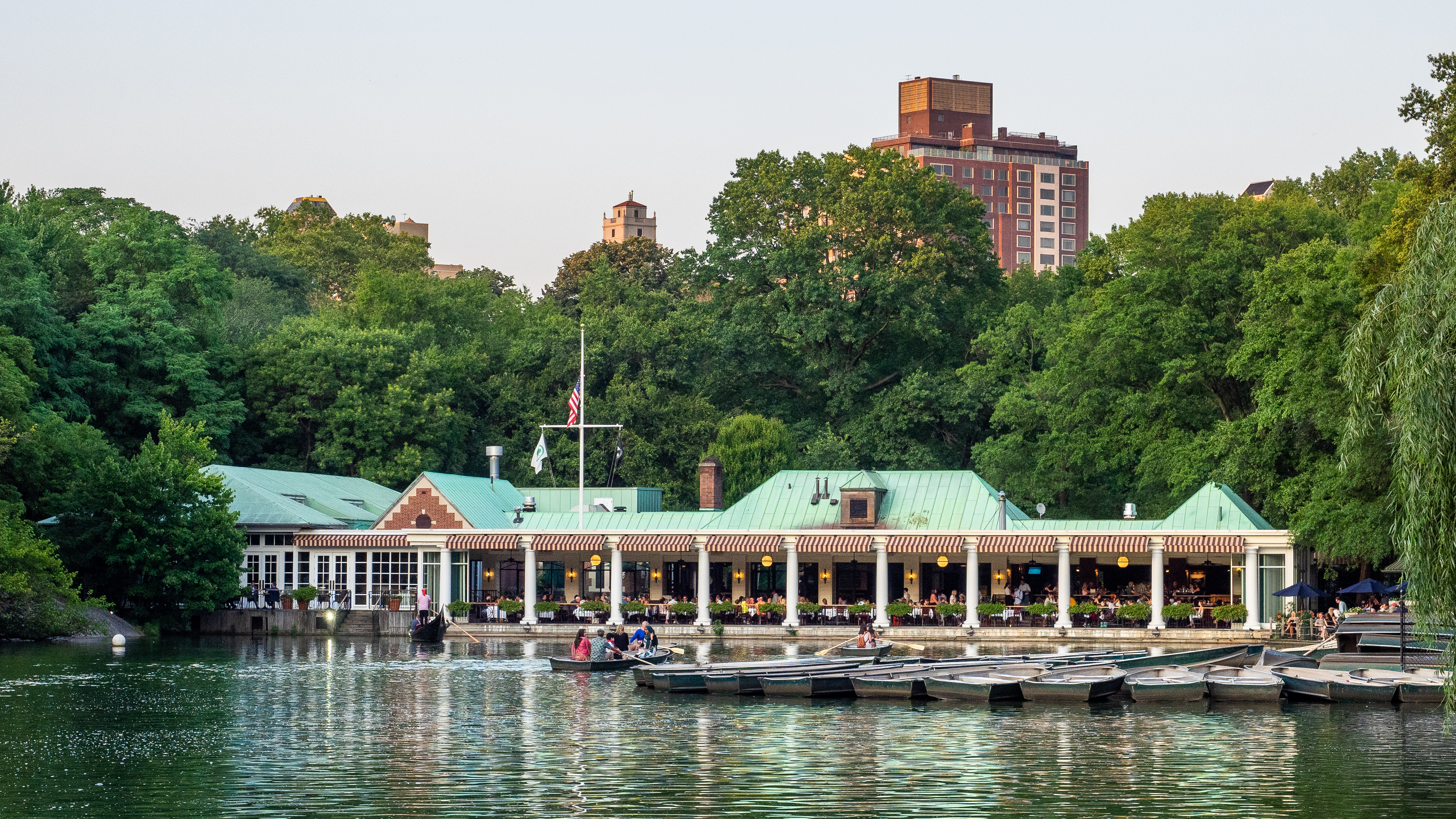
Loeb Boathouse Cafe

The Loeb Boathouse, on the eastern shore of the Lake, is one of several boat landings that have existed on the Lake throughout its history. Boating concessions were granted in the early 1860s, and rowboating on the Lake soon became popular. Six docks on the Lake were built by 1865, although the boats were stored near Bethesda Terrace. In 1870, Olmsted and Vaux suggested the construction of a permanent boathouse to launch and store the boats, and the Victorian-style boathouse was finished by 1873 or 1874. However, it fell into disrepair in the mid-20th century and was destroyed by 1950.

A brick-and-limestone boathouse, financed by a $305,000 donation from businessman Carl M. Loeb and another $110,000 from NYC Parks, was completed in 1954. In 1983, the boathouse was renovated for $750,000, and a 40-seat restaurant opened within the boathouse. Since then, the Loeb Boathouse has contained a formal dining room, dining terraces, and concession stands, as well as a rowboat rental. Dean Poll took over the boathouse in 2000; under his management, the restaurant's annual revenue grew to $20 million by the mid-2010s. After Poll announced that the restaurant would close in October 2022, NYC Parks secured a new operator for the restaurant, Legends Hospitality, in early 2023. The Loeb Boathouse opened for limited service in June 2023 following a $3.25 million renovation, and it fully reopened in March 2024. Over the years, the boathouse has been depicted in media such as the TV series Sex and the City, the film When Harry Met Sally..., and The Walking Dead: Dead City.

=== Other nearby structures ===
Vista Rock is on the northwest corner of the Lake, just above the 79th Street transverse. With a height of 130 feet (40 m), it is the second-highest point in Central Park. Atop the rock is Belvedere Castle, a folly built in 1869–1871. Though it originally had no doors or windows, these furnishings were installed when the castle was used as a weather station from 1919 to 1960. Today, Belvedere Castle serves as a visitors' center.

The Swedish Cottage Marionette Theatre is just northwest of the Lake and west of Vista Rock. Originally prefabricated in Sweden and formerly known as the Swedish Schoolhouse, it was shipped to the U.S. for the 1876 Centennial Exposition before being relocated to Central Park. A 200-book nature library was opened in the structure in 1901. Since 1947, it has housed one of the nation's last marionette companies.

Strawberry Fields, a 2.5-acre (1.0-hectare) landscaped memorial, is southwest of the Lake. It is dedicated to the memory of former Beatles member John Lennon, who was murdered outside his nearby home, the Dakota. The memorial was dedicated in his honor in 1981 and rebuilt completely in 1985. Its most notable feature is the "Imagine" memorial mosaic in the center.

== History ==
=== Construction and opening ===
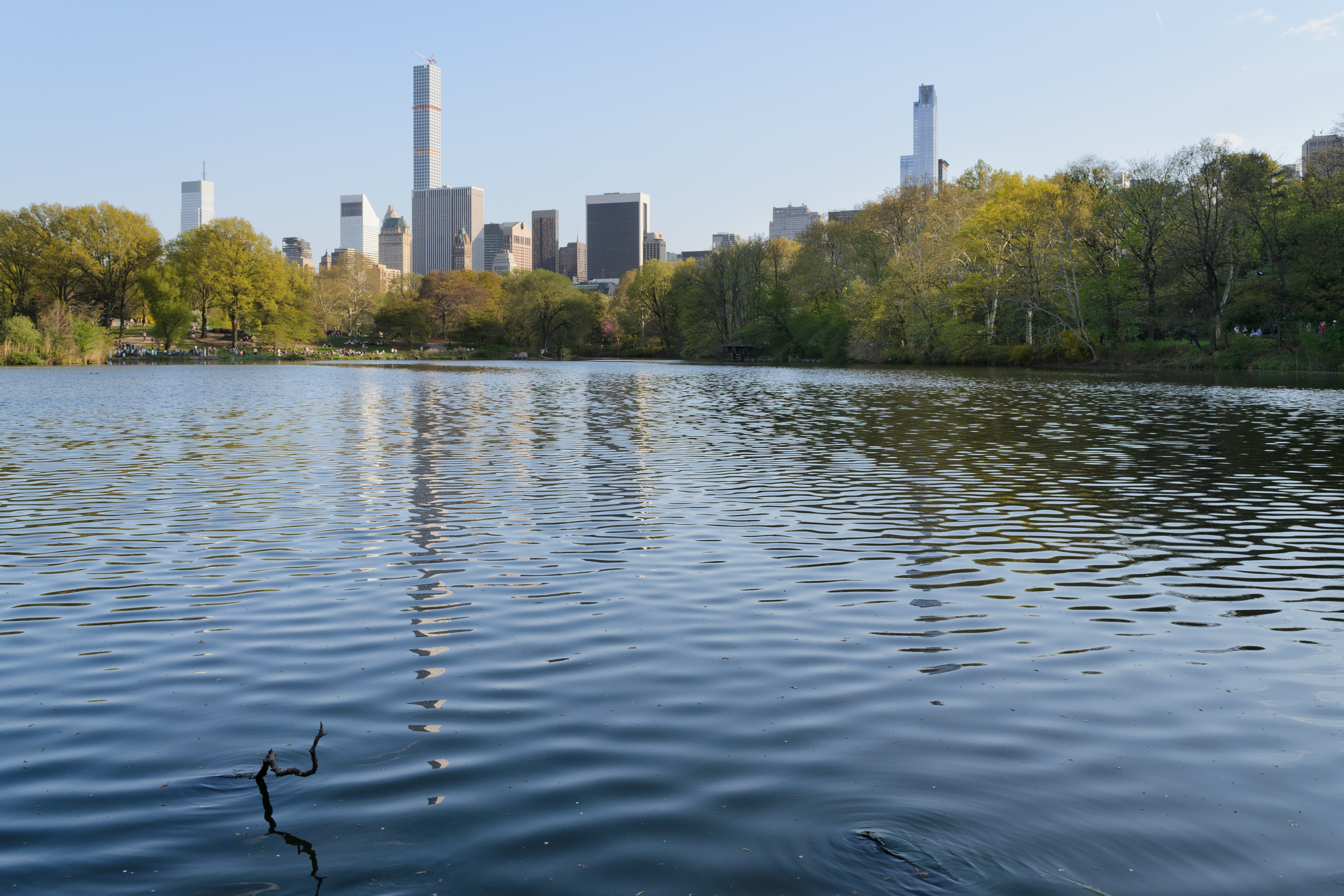
Seen in May 2015

The Ramble and Lake were two of the first features to be built in Central Park. Together they formed the northern end of the Central Park Mall, the only formal feature in the Greensward Plan. The Lake was formed from part of the Sawkill Creek, a natural creek which flowed near the American Museum of Natural History. The creek ran through the park site, south of Seneca Village, originally exiting the park under Fifth Avenue near East 74th Street, where Conservatory Water lies today, before emptying in the East River. To create the Lake, the outlet was dammed with a broad, curving earth dam, which carries the East Carriage Drive past the Kerbs Boathouse (1954), at the end of the Lake's eastern arm.

In late August 1857, after Central Park's construction was approved, workers began building fences, clearing vegetation, draining the land, and leveling uneven terrain. The Lake was the first feature to be completed, partially due to the fact that it was being filled from water that was drained from the adjacent Ramble. It opened to the public as an ice skating ground that December. The Lake's center was seven feet deep, with terraced shorelines to lower levels for skaters' safety. The Ramble, the second section of the park to be completed, formally opened in June 1859. The Ramble and Lake soon gained popularity: while 15,000 people visited the Ramble daily in July 1859, this number grew to 20,000 by late August, 40,000 by mid-October, and 50,000 by Christmas that same year.

The Greensward Plan was required to include a musical venue, and the original plan was for a music stand to be placed at the Rumsey Playfield, above the Mall and just south of the Lake. The first concert in Central Park occurred in the Ramble on July 6, 1859, and later on, concerts also occurred in the Lake. However, concerts in the Ramble were a short-lived phenomenon. A concert pavilion in the Mall, at the top of Bethesda Terrace, was approved in 1862, and by the pavilion's completion three years later, most of the concerts had shifted to the Mall.

=== Decline ===
The maintenance effort of the Ramble and Lake, as did the rest of the park, declined slightly in the early and mid-20th century. In 1927, mayor Jimmy Walker commissioned Herman W. Merkel, a landscape designer, to survey the park and create a plan for improvement. Merkel's report noted that while the condition of the Ramble was "disreputable" with its many dead plants and trees, Central Park's overall condition was "fairly good".

Some structures were closed or demolished in the mid-20th century. The Cave was closed by 1934 due to crime. The deteriorating boathouse on the Lake was closed in 1950 and replaced in 1954. By 1971, the Ladies' Pavilion had also been destroyed by vandals, though it was replaced two years later.

=== Restoration ===
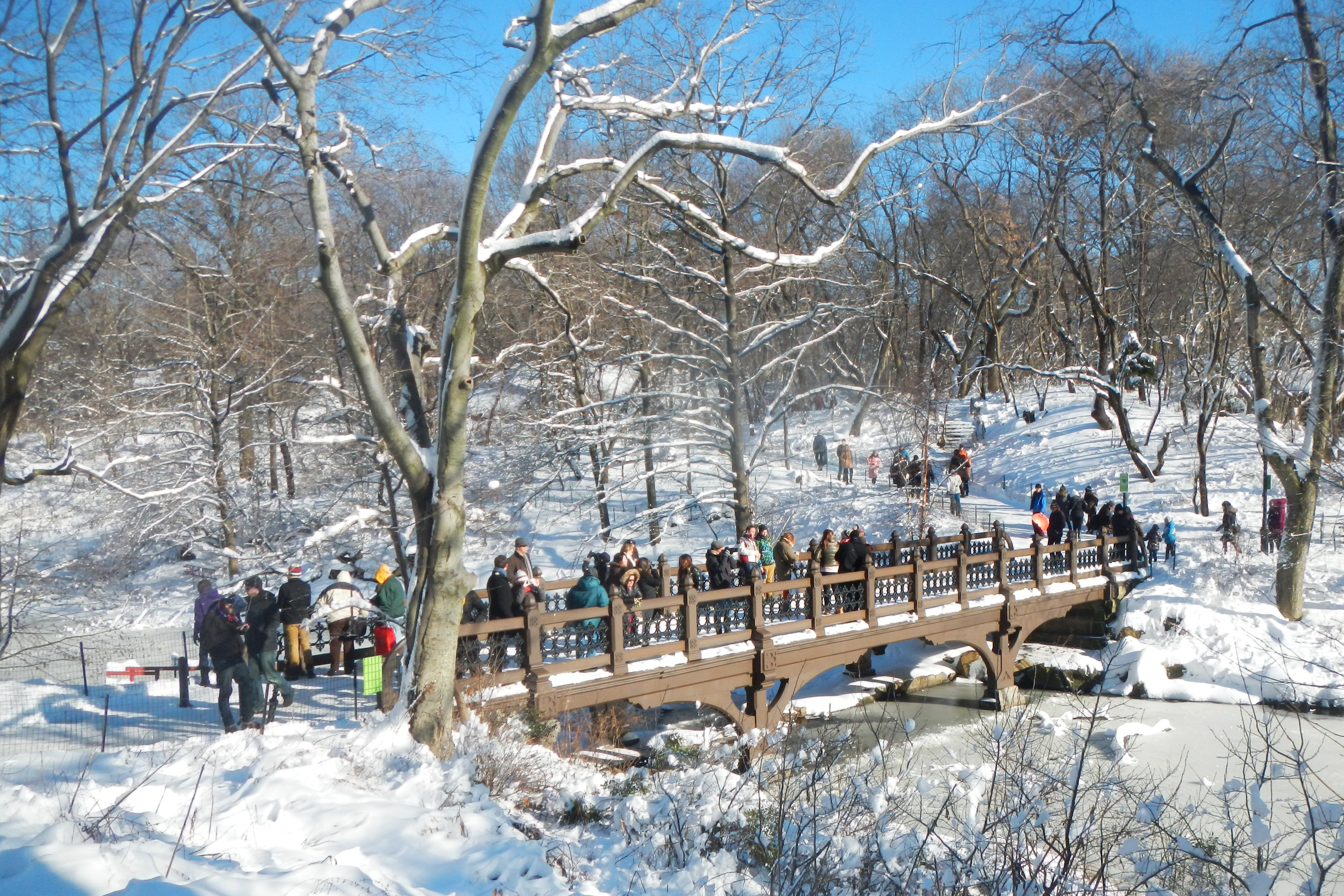
Oak Bridge spanning Bank Rock Bay was replaced in 2009 following Calvert Vaux's original design of 1860

The Ramble was partially restored in the late 20th century. These renovations started with the Ladies' Pavilion, which was restored to its original design in 1979. In early 1981, the Central Park Conservancy cleared trees in the Ramble to allow more sunlight to reach the Ramble. However, this decision was criticized by birders, who said that the destruction of trees would remove shelter places for birds. The restoration of the Gill was subsequently approved in 1982. A path in the Ramble, Iphigene's Walk, was dedicated in 1987 to one of the key backers of the Ramble's 1980s renovation.

The Central Park Conservancy renovated the Lake's shoreline starting in 2006, in a project to enhance both its ecological and scenic aspects. In mid-2007, the first phase of a restoration of the Lake and its shoreline plantings commenced, with replanting using native shrubs and understory trees around the northern end of the Lake. In the earliest stages, invasive non-native plants like Japanese knotweed were eradicated, the slopes were regraded with added humus and protected with landscaping burlap to stabilize the slopes while root systems became established and leaf litter developed.

Bank Rock Bridge was recreated in its original materials following Calvert Vaux's original design of 1859–60. The replacement bridge was made of steel, clad in ornamental cast iron facings, with a wooden deck. The new bridge was rededicated in September 2009.

The cascade, where the Gill empties into the lake, was reconstructed to approximate its dramatic original form, inspired by paintings of Asher B. Durand. Sections of the Lake were dredged of accumulated silt—topsoil that had washed off the surrounding slopes—and the island formerly in the lake, which gradually eroded below water level, was reconstructed in mid-2007 with rugged boulders along its shoreline, graded wetland areas, and submerged planting shelves for water-loving native plants, like pickerel weed.

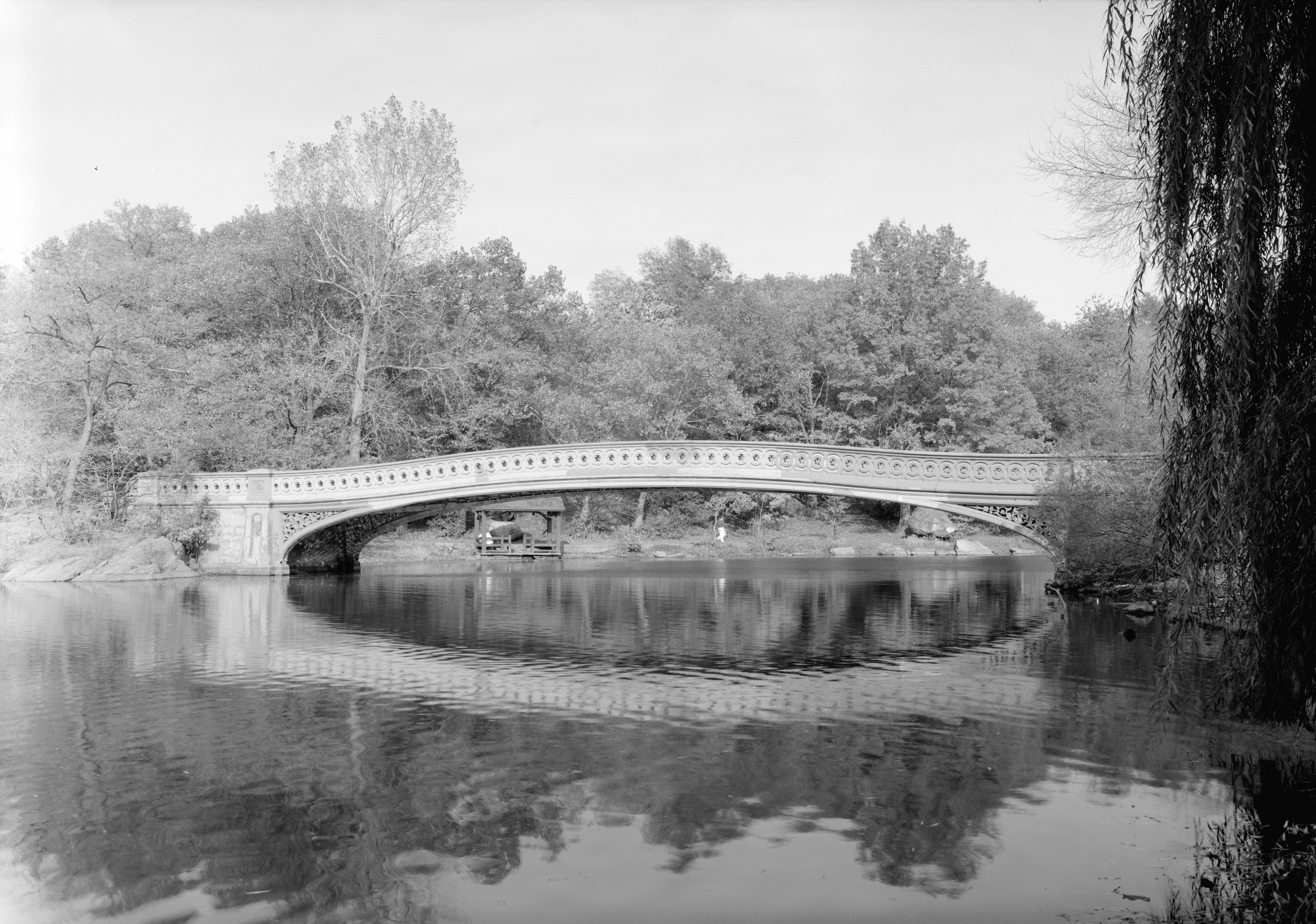
Bow Bridge spans the Lake at its narrowest point

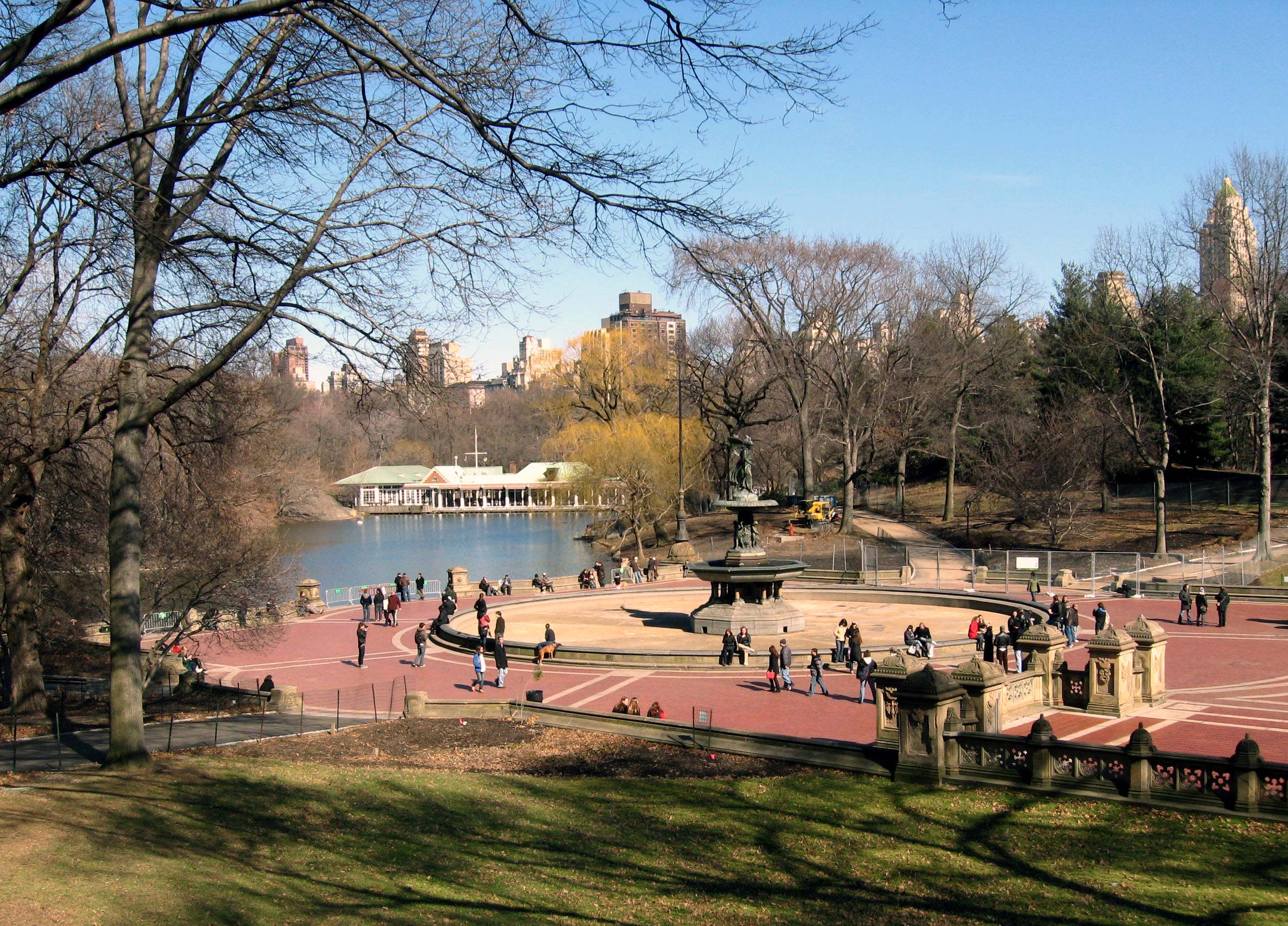
East end of the Lake and Loeb Boathouse, foreshortened as seen from Bethesda Terrace

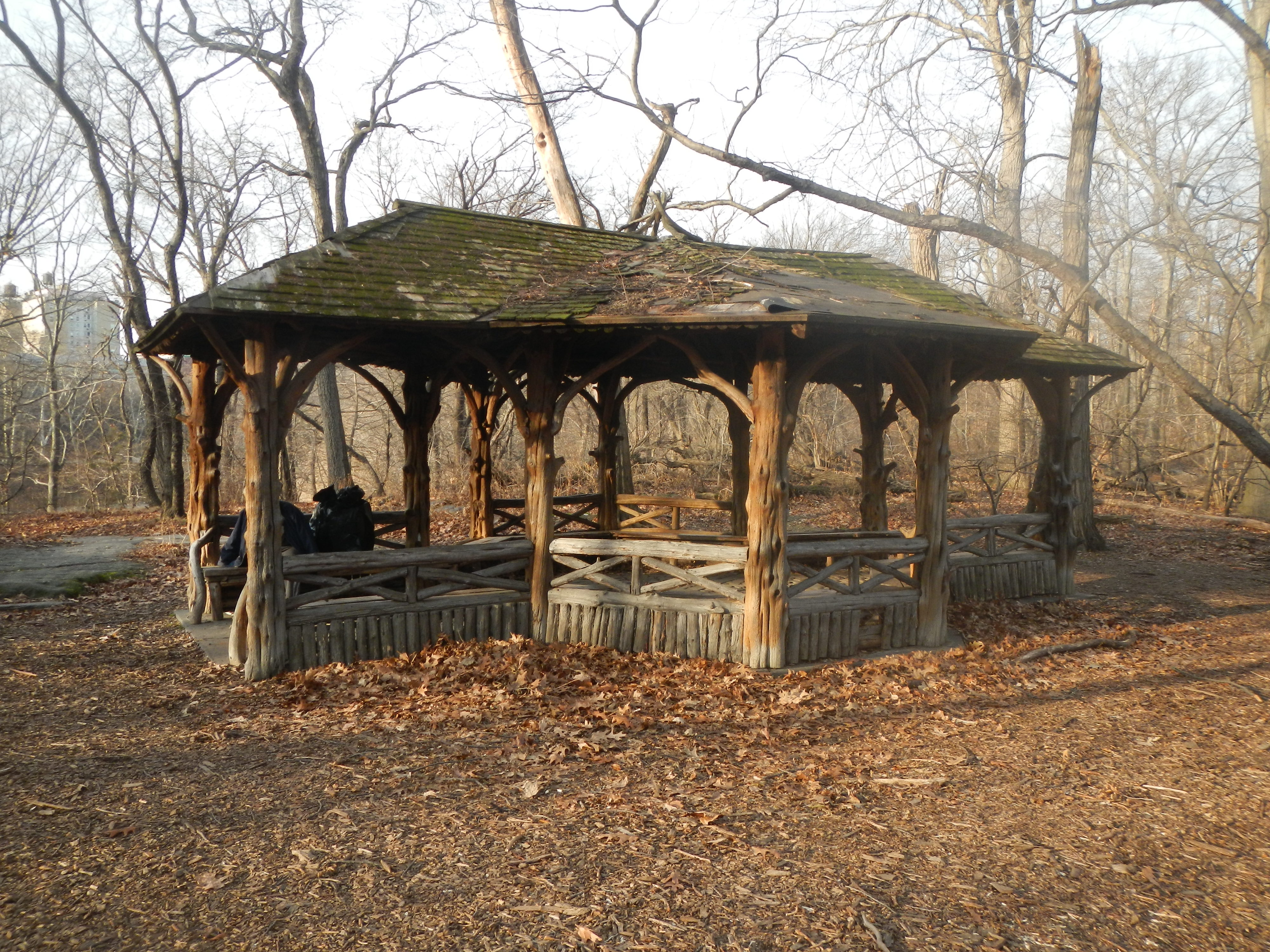
Rustic Shelter, central to the Ramble

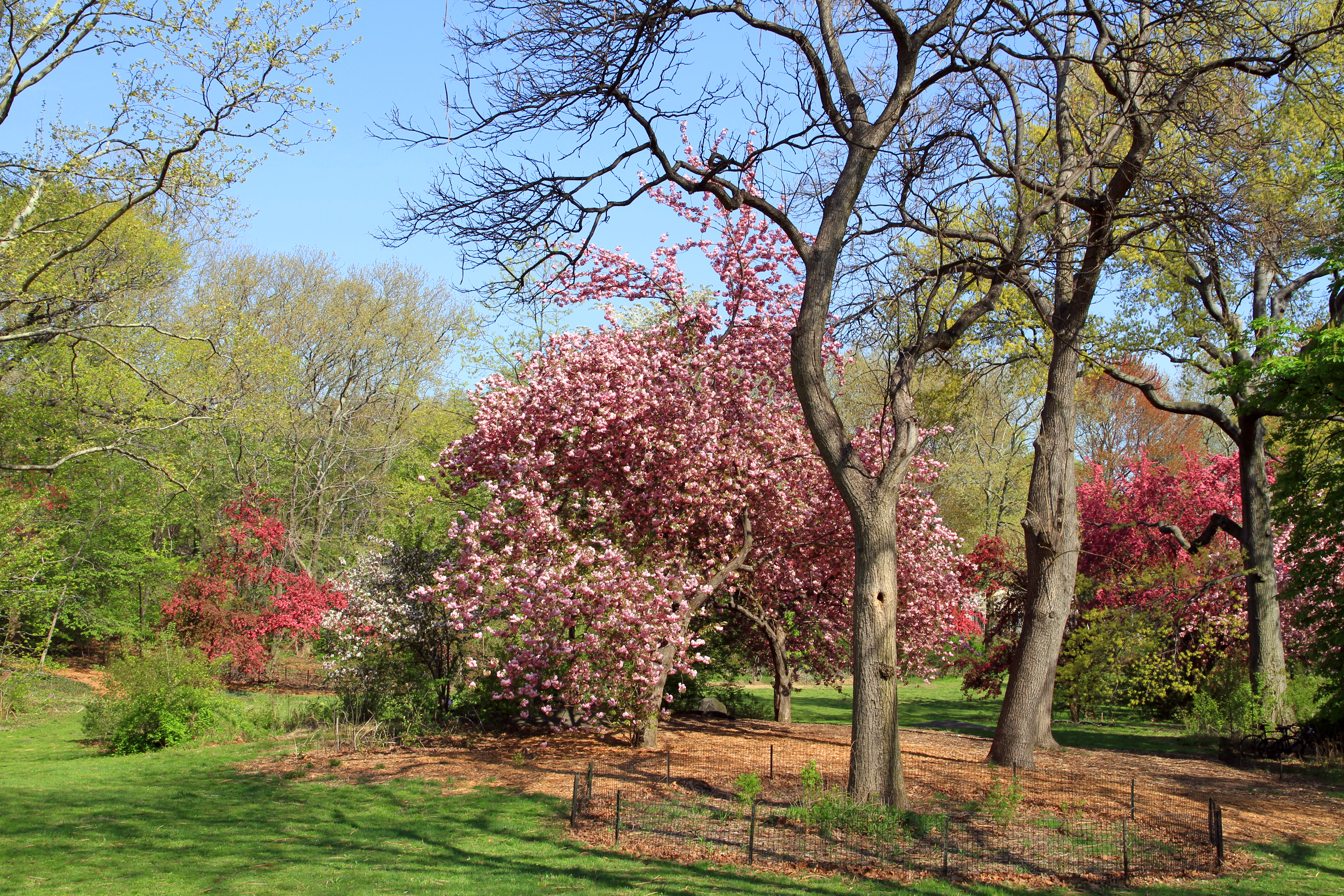
The Ramble in the spring

== Birdwatching ==
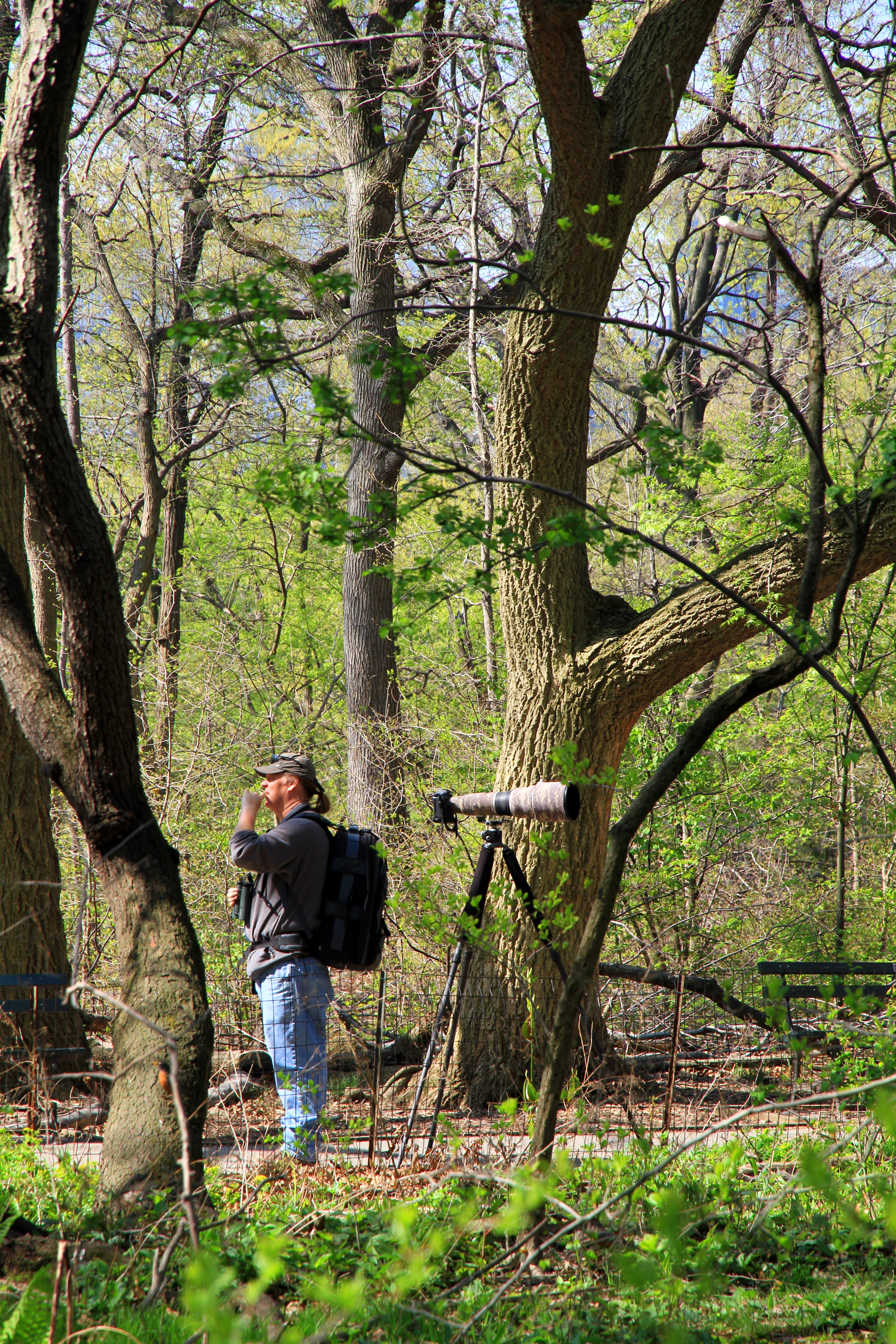
Birdwatching in the Ramble

The Ramble is one of the major centers of birdwatching in Central Park. At least 250 species of birds have been spotted over the years, including more than 20 species of warblers that pass through during spring and fall migration in April and October. One of the most popular birding spots is Azalea Pond, along the waterfront.

== Cruising ==
Since at least the early 20th century, the seclusion of the Ramble has been used by gay men for cruising. In the 1920s, the lawn at the north end was referred to as the "fruited plain", and in the 1950s and 1960s, the Ramble was feared by many as a haven for "anti-social persons". In the early 1960s, under Mayor Robert F. Wagner Jr., the Parks Department proposed building a senior center in the Ramble with the hope of curbing cruising and anti-gay assaults.

In 1980, an ad was placed in The Village Voice looking for gay men interested in playing soccer in the Ramble, giving rise to the New York Ramblers, among the world's first openly gay soccer clubs. Today, the Ramble's reputation for cruising has given way somewhat to nature walks and environmentalism. However, some in the gay community still consider the Ramble to be "ground zero for outdoor gay sex", enjoying the "retro feel" of sneaking off into the woods.
