= George Hervey Hallett Jr. =

American civic activist and birder

George Hervey Hallett Jr. (1895–1985) was a civic activist, electoral reformer, author and avid birder. As long-standing official of the Citizens Union of the City of New York, a municipal reform group, , he led the change to proportional representation in the 1930s and in the 1970s, he led the revision of the New York City Charter.

Hallett was born in 1895 to a Quaker family in Philadelphia, Pennsylvania. He attended Haverford College, received a master's degree in mathematics from Harvard University and a PhD from the University of Pennsylvania. He was a conscientious objector during World War I. Hallett was a prominent advocate of proportional representation in politics. He authored the 1937 book Proportional Representation The Key to Democracy and co-authored with C.G. Hoag the 1926 book Proportional Representation.

In the 1970s, while in his 70s, he led a campaign for the revision of the New York City Charter. This was adopted by voters in 1975.

He died in 1985.

The 4-acre (1.6 ha) Hallett Nature Sanctuary in the southern end of New York City's Central Park was dedicated to his memory on June 30, 1986.
