= Jacqueline Kennedy Onassis Reservoir =

Reservoir in Central Park, New York City

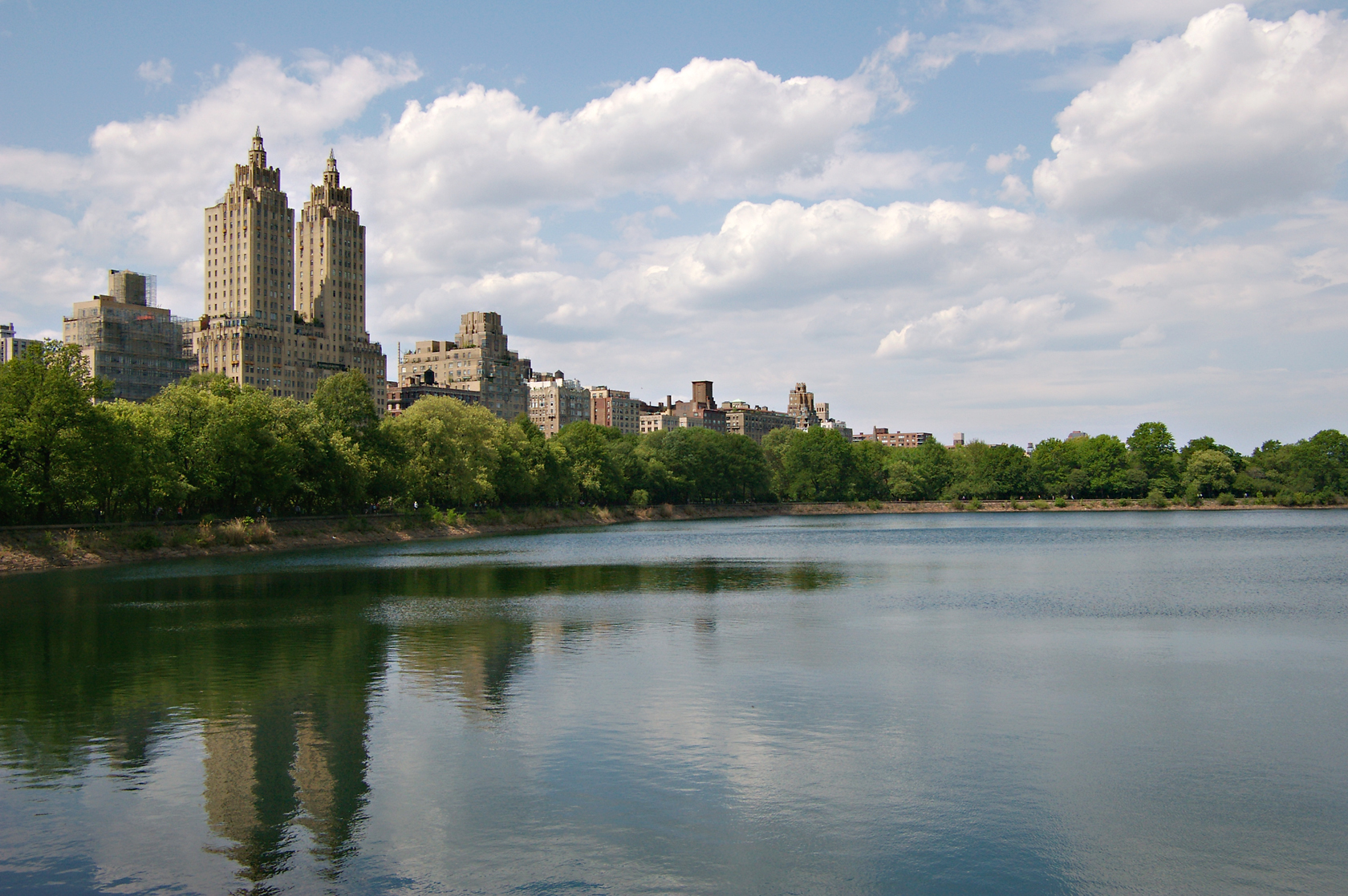

- Location within New York City
- Location: Central Park, New York City
- Coordinates: 40°47′6.32″N 73°57′37.71″W
- Type: Reservoir
- Basin countries: United States
- Surface area: 106 acres (43 ha)
- Average depth: 29 ft (8.8 m)
- Water volume: 1,000,000,000 US gal (3,800,000 m^{3}) 3070 ac ft
- Shore length^{1}: 1.58 mi (2.5 km)
- Surface elevation: 121 ft (37 m)
- ^{1} Shore length is not a well-defined measure.

The Jacqueline Kennedy Onassis Reservoir, also known as Central Park Reservoir, is a decommissioned reservoir in Central Park in the New York City borough of Manhattan, stretching from 86th to 96th Streets. It covers 106 acres (43 ha) and holds over 1 billion US gal (3.8 million m^{3}) of water.

In the 1850s, Nicholas Dean, the board president of the Croton Aqueduct water distribution system, proposed that Central Park be planned around its existing receiving reservoir (known then as the Yorkville Reservoir and nowadays the site of the Great Lawn and Turtle Pond). To supplement the distribution system, a second reservoir, the Central Park Reservoir, was completed in 1862. After the construction of the second reservoir, it was usually styled the Upper Reservoir, and the Yorkville Reservoir usually styled the Lower Reservoir.

The Lower Reservoir was decommissioned in 1903 and demolished in the 1930s. In 1993, the Upper Reservoir was decommissioned and control eventually transferred to the Department of Parks and Recreation. The reservoir was renamed in 1994 in honor of Jacqueline Kennedy Onassis to commemorate her many contributions to the city and because she had enjoyed jogging in the area.

== History ==
Notable buildings and structures of Central Park. Click on the map and then on the points for details.

=== Design and construction ===
In the 1850s, Central Park was proposed by Croton Aqueduct Board president Nicholas Dean, who chose the site because the Croton Aqueduct's 35-acre (14 ha), 150-million-US-gallon (570×10^{6} L) receiving reservoir would be in the geographical center. This reservoir, built in 1842, was known as the Yorkville Reservoir or the Lower Reservoir and was located on what is now the site of Turtle Pond. The site to the north was marshland, drained by the Sawkill.

In 1857 a design competition was held for Central Park. The competitors were required to comply with extremely detailed specifications, and to provide at least four east–west transverse roads through the park, a parade ground of 20 to 40 acres (8.1 to 16.2 ha), and at least three playgrounds of between 3 and 10 acres (1.2 and 4.0 ha). Furthermore, the plans had to incorporate a larger "Upper Reservoir" for the Croton Aqueduct. The winning design was Frederick Law Olmsted and Calvert Vaux's Greensward Plan. Vaux designed its two pumphouses of Manhattan schist with granite facings. It was never a collecting reservoir, but rather, supplemented the smaller, nearby receiving reservoir.

For several months, Central Park's commissioners faced delays and resistance from the New York City common council while attempting to gain funding. A dedicated work force and funding stream was not secured until June 1858. The landscaped Upper Reservoir was the only part of the park that the commissioners were not responsible for constructing; instead, the Reservoir would be built by the Croton Aqueduct board. Work on the Reservoir started in April 1858. The southern section of Central Park below 79th Street was mostly completed by 1860, and the Croton Aqueduct board also started filling in the Reservoir around this time. The Upper Reservoir was finished by 1862. An 1875 map of Central Park clearly shows the Lower and Upper reservoirs.

=== Decommissioning ===
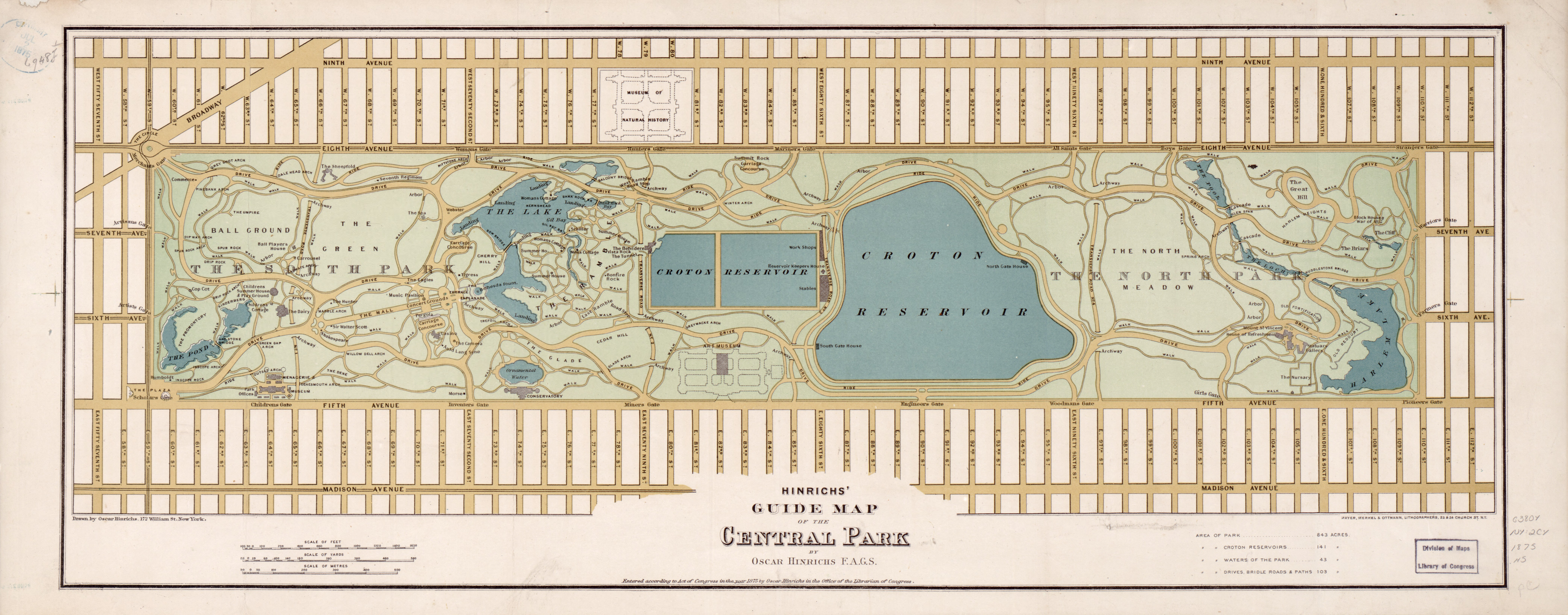
Heinrich's 1875 Guide Map of Central Park

The reservoir was decommissioned in 1993, after it was deemed obsolete because of a new main under 79th Street that connected with the Third Water Tunnel, and because of growing concerns that it could become contaminated. Though deemed obsolete, it remained a part of the NYC water supply and it was intended to be used to supplement the city's upstate water supply in drought emergencies. Concern about the reservoir's future grew in early 1992: many people worried that the city would put turf over it as was done in the 1920s, when the adjacent Lower Reservoir was deemed obsolete, and the Great Lawn was developed over the Lower Reservoir's former site. Despite various plans to reuse the Upper Reservoir's site for some other purpose, residents and advocates wrote letters to the Central Park Conservancy and city government to preserve the reservoir as-is.

Papers were signed to allow for the transfer of the reservoir in 1999 from the Department of Environmental Protection (DEP) to the Department of Parks and Recreation. The year 1999 was chosen because it was the projected completion date for a filtration plant at Van Cortlandt Park, near the Jerome Reservoir in the Bronx, which is part of the city's Croton water-supply system. The Croton Water Filtration Plant was activated in 2015. In 2025, the DEP launched a request for proposals for the adaptive reuse of the reservoir's two gatehouses.

=== Renaming ===
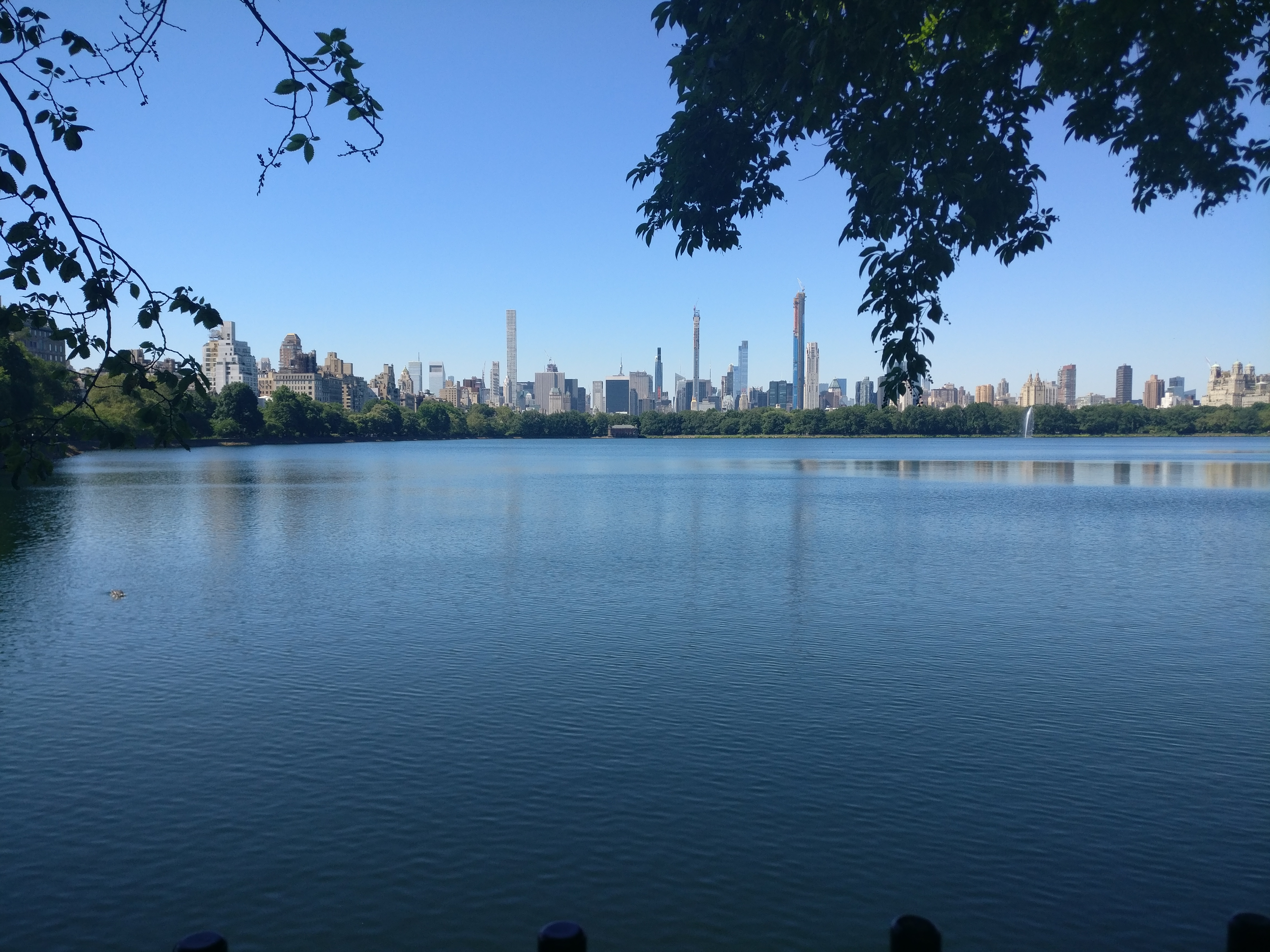
Looking south across the reservoir

In 1994 the reservoir was renamed in honor of Jacqueline Kennedy Onassis to commemorate her many contributions to the city (which included helping to save Grand Central Terminal from demolition and helping to restore it as an architectural landmark, protesting against proposed structures that would have marred Central Park's beauty, and serving as a board member of the Municipal Art Society). Furthermore, she enjoyed jogging in the area, and the windows of her apartment at 1040 Fifth Avenue overlooked the reservoir.

== Description ==
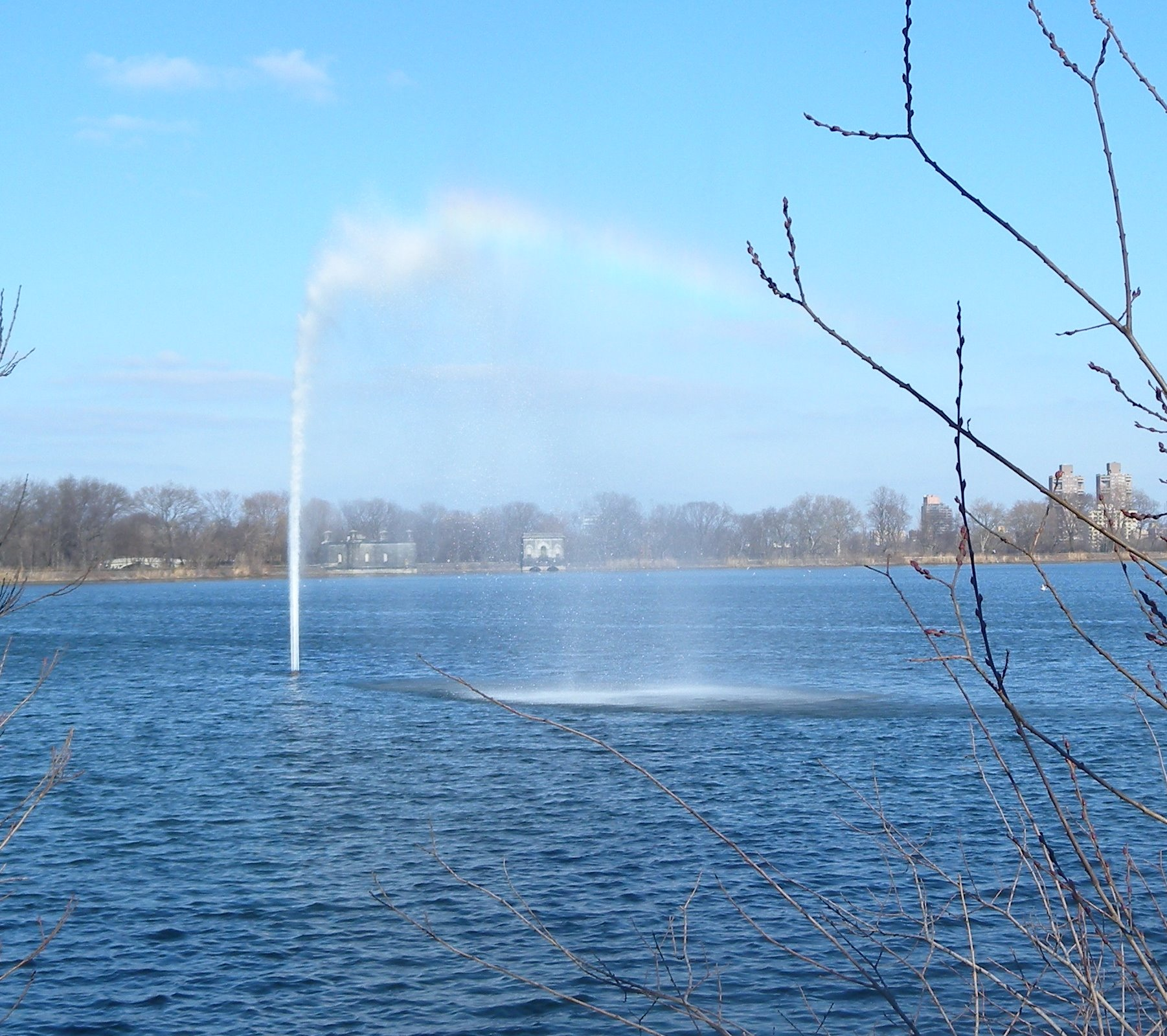
The fountain in the reservoir

The reservoir covers 106 acres (43 ha) and holds over 1,000,000,000 US gallons (3,800,000 m^{3}) of water. Though no longer a part of New York City's water supply system, it does supply water to the nearby Pool and Harlem Meer.

It is a popular place of interest in Central Park. Many joggers have used the 1.58-mile (2.54 km) Stephanie and Fred Shuman Running Track, including Bill Clinton, Barack Obama, Madonna, and Jacqueline Kennedy Onassis. The track is separated from the water by a fence installed in 2003 to re-create the original 19th-century cast iron fence. The design was based on a section of the original fence discovered by scuba divers at the bottom of the reservoir.

The north and south gatehouses are connected by a visible causeway bisecting the reservoir, which is actually the top of a wall that splits the reservoir into two chambers. The bifurcation was intended to allow one half to be drained for maintenance while the other half continued to function. As originally designed, the north gatehouse pumped water into the reservoir while the south gatehouse pumped water out, so as to supply water to lower Manhattan. There is a clock face on the south gatehouse's front facade, along the 86th Street Transverse, while the south gatehouse's rear facade has a balcony. The gatehouses were decommissioned in 1993 but remain in place, controlling the reservoir's water level.

The reservoir is often visited by tourists, especially when its double pink "Yoshino" cherry trees (Prunus x yedoensis), followed by "Kanzan" cherry trees Prunus serrulata, are blooming. The rhododendrons along the "Rhododendron Mile" were a gift to the city from Mrs. Russell Sage in 1909.

The reservoir area is one of the main ecological sanctuaries in the park, attracting more than 20 species of waterbirds: coots, mergansers, northern shovelers, ruddy ducks, buffleheads, loons, cormorants, wood ducks, American black ducks, gadwall, grebes, herons and egrets, along with various species of gulls, may be seen in addition to the familiar mallards and Canada geese, making it a popular venue for birdwatchers.

== In popular culture ==
Films showing the Onassis Reservoir include:

- Central Park (1932)
- Marathon Man (1976)
- Hannah and Her Sisters (1986)
- Devil's Advocate (1997)
- Sex and the City (2008)

Television shows include:

- Gossip Girl (2007–2012)
- The Marvelous Mrs. Maisel (2017–2023)
- The Boys (2019)
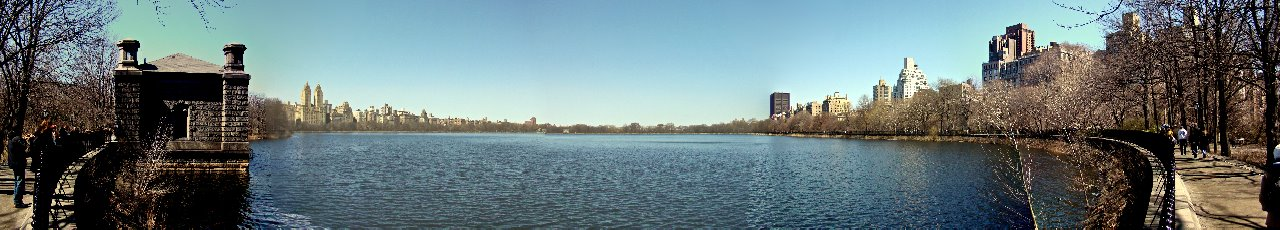
Panorama of the reservoir looking North
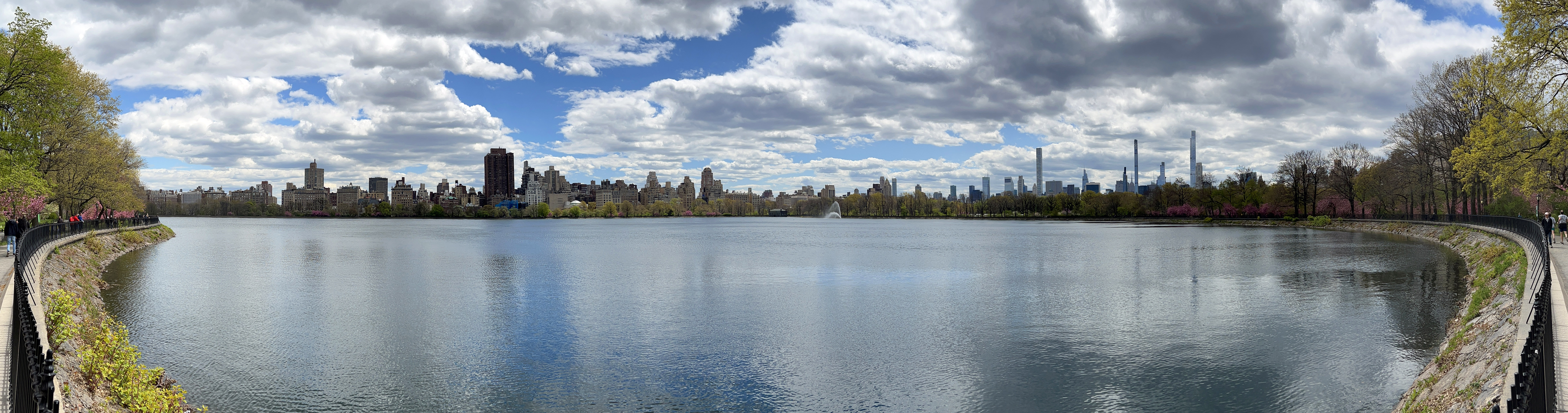
Panorama of the reservoir looking South

== See also ==
- New York City water supply system
- Sawkill
