= Sawkill =

Former stream in Manhattan, New York

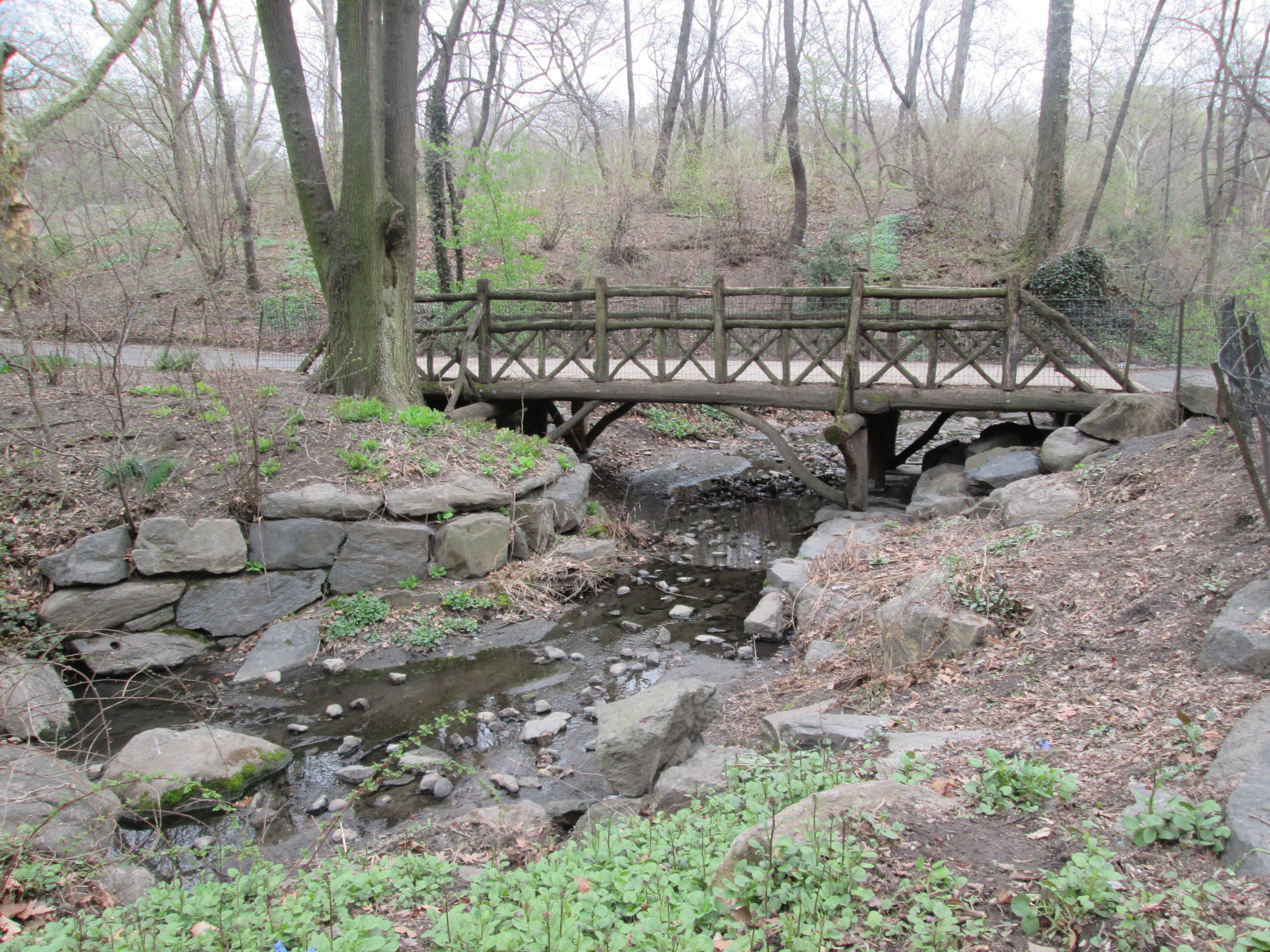
Remnant of the Sawkill in Central Park

The Sawkill or Saw-kill (the Dutch place-name for Saw Mill Creek) was the largest hydrological network on Manhattan island in New York City before the Dutch colony of New Netherland was founded in 1624. This 44,980-foot-long (13,710 m) stream began "within four blocks of the Hudson River":

A rill flowing east from the rocky ridge overlooking Bloomingdale Village, which rose near Ninth Avenue and 85th Street, flowed in a southerly direction through Manhattan Square, where it spread into a little pond, and then turned east, crossing Central Park to Fifth Avenue, receiving three tributaries within its limits, two from the north and one from the south. At 75th Street near Third Avenue it was joined by another stream. Near this junction the old Boston Post Road crossed it, and then from this point, the stream ran due east to its outlet near the foot of 75th Street

emptying into the East River between two rocky points. Along its route the stream separated into two branches, with the name 'Sawkill' reserved for the southern arm of the creek. The name for the smaller, northern stream is undocumented, but is recorded by the Randel Map (1870) as entering the East River at 79th Street. (Note: 40.784982°N 73.982660°W was the northern branch mouth of the Sawkill in 1609.)

== Early history ==
Undoubtedly, the stream received its name from the saw mill that existed for some time "in the bed of 74th Street, about 250 ft east of Avenue A." The workers of the saw mill are thought to have been primarily the slaves of the Dutch West India Company, whose lodgings, stationed at the mouth of the Sawkill until at least 1639, were referenced as "the quarter of the blacks, the [West India] company's slaves" in the first landmark map of Manhattan Island, the Manatus Map of 1639. It is thought that the slaves would use the stream to float the logs hewn by the mill to the East River, from which they would be transported to the newly established fort at New Amsterdam, at the southern tip of Manhattan Island, or thence to the Netherlands.

The creek originated at the present day site of the American Museum of Natural History. The creek ran through the park site, south of Seneca Village, originally exiting the park under Fifth Avenue near 74th Street, where Conservatory Water lies today, before emptying in the East River. To create the Central Park Lake the outlet was dammed with a broad, curving earth dam, which carries the East Carriage Drive past the Kerbs Boathouse (1954), at the end of the Lake's eastern arm, so subtly that few visitors are aware of the landform's function.

== Arch Brook ==
Although local historian Isaac Newton Phelps Stokes regarded the Sawkill as, "the well known Saw-kill, which played an important part in the early days of Manhattan" by 1677, when the land was transferred from the Dutch West India Company to Abraham Shotwell, the stream was known commonly as "ye run of water, formerly called ye saw mill creeke." Eventually the saw mill was replaced by a leather mill and the Sawkill was dammed and arched over in the early-mid 19th century, creating a much smaller stream called Arch Brook. It seems that the bridge traversing the Sawkill, however, remained a popular "Kissing Bridge" (first noted as such in 1806) throughout the 19th century.

== Central Park ==
While even Arch Brook has long since disappeared, the waters of the Sawkill are still present in Central Park. Park planners used the remnants of the Saw-kill's source waters to create the picturesque Lake situated in the middle of the Park between 71st and 78th streets. The upper portion of the Saw-kill within the Park was also utilized to connect the two bays of Ladies Pond, a small ice skating pond west of the Lake that was reserved for women's private use.

Until 1930, when Ladies Pond was filled in to serve as a pedestrian path, the Sawkill remained an active watercourse. One of the rustic bridges built as part of the park still spans the former site of the Ladies Pond. In 2000, it was dedicated the "Triplets Bridge", after Benjamin, Rachel and Justin Chasalow. 40.77942°N 73.9729°W The Balcony Bridge also crosses over the former pond to the east.
