= Jacob Wrey Mould =

British-American architect

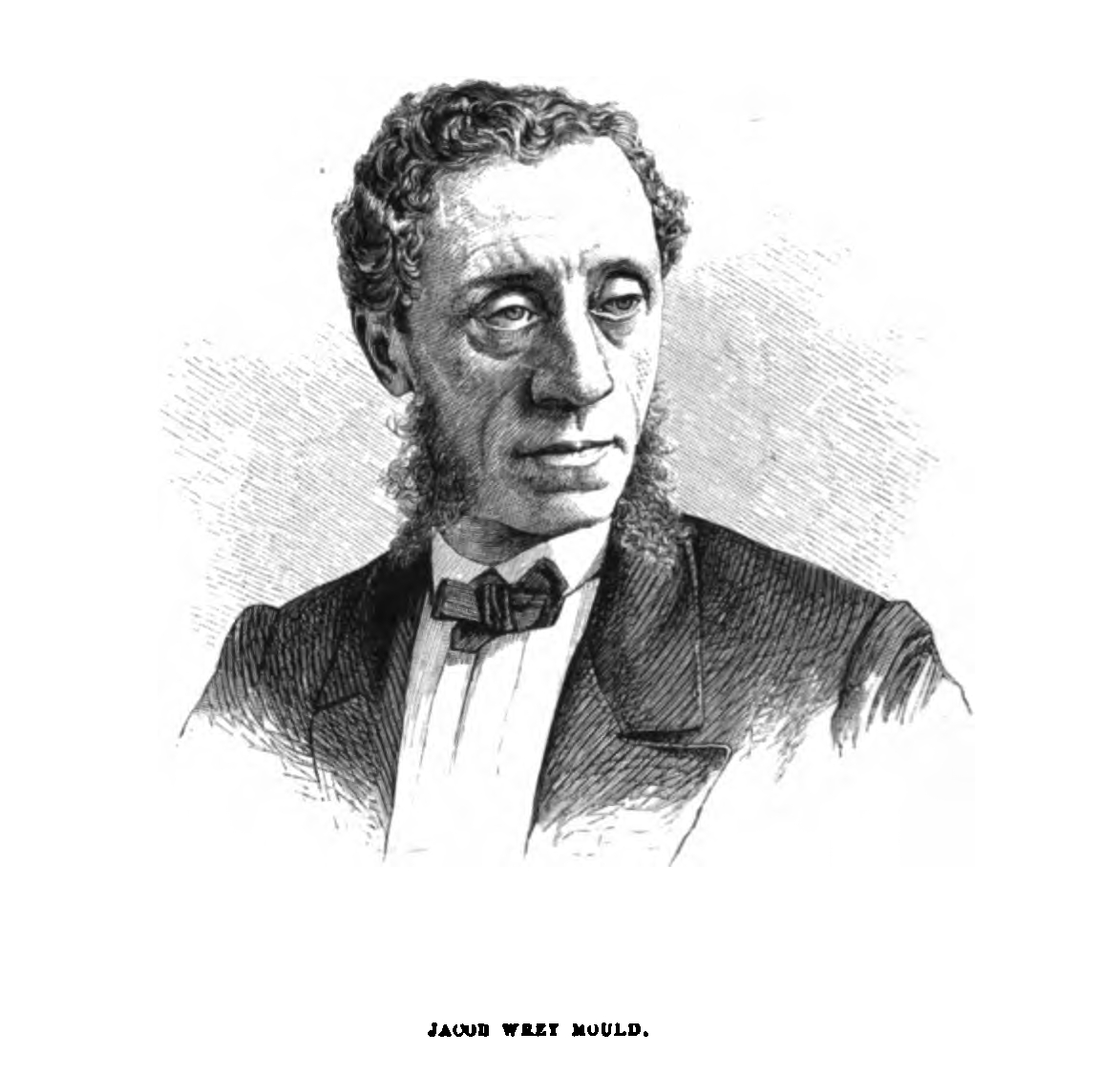
Engraving of Mould from A Description of the New York Central Park, published in 1869 by Clarence Cook

Jacob Wrey Mould (7 August 1825 – 14 June 1886) was a British architect, illustrator, linguist and musician, noted for his contributions to the design and construction of New York City's Central Park. He was "instrumental" in bringing the British High Victorian style of architecture to the United States, and was a founding member of the American Institute of Architects.

== Biography ==
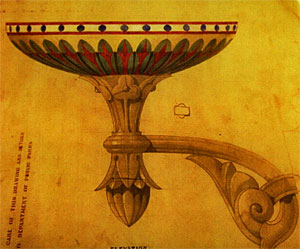
A drawing of a lamp by Mould

Born in Chislehurst, Kent in 1825, Mould attended King's College School in 1842. For two years, he studied the Alhambra in Spain under Owen Jones, the "master of polychromy," with whom he later co-designed the "Turkish Chamber" of Buckingham Palace. Mould's subsequent designs were often influenced by his appreciation of the Moorish style of architecture.

Mould designed decorations for The Great Exhibition in London in 1851. He moved to the United States in 1852, and worked on the Crystal Palace Exhibition in Manhattan. He was invited by Moses H. Grinnell in 1853 to design and build Unitarian Church of All Souls, and then was brought in on early plans for the great urban park in the heart of the city, Central Park. Working closely with creators Calvert Vaux and Frederick Law Olmsted, he designed many of the park's notable landmarks, including the "graceful" and "richly decorated" old Bandstand, Belvedere Castle, a great number of bridges, and the carvings on the Bethesda Terrace.

Though described as eccentric and ill-mannered, Mould was hired full-time as an assistant city architect in 1857, and from 1870 to 1871 was architect-in-chief for the Department of Public Works. In the 1860s, he had also built two notable country houses on Long Island on Hempstead Bay, both of which were lavish and ornate buildings for rich clients from New York. Mould also collaborated with Vaux on the design of the original Metropolitan Museum of Art and the American Museum of Natural History, and designed the fountain at City Hall Park (1871).

Mould's reputation was severely damaged in 1861 when it became public knowledge that he was living with a woman who was not his wife. Many of his friends stopped associating with him, including well-known lawyer and civic leader George Templeton Strong. Despite facing rejection from his old social circles, Strong and others tempered their criticism of Mould's character with acknowledgements of his artistic talent. Fortunately for Mould, the scandal did not damage his professional relationships with Olmsted or Vaux.

In 1874, Mould went to Lima, Peru, with Henry Meiggs, where he helped design a public park. He returned to New York in 1879, and resumed his duties for the Department of Public Works until his death in New York City on 14 June 1886 at age 60. He built the Morningside Park promenade in 1883, and his final design in the United States was a temporary tomb for President Ulysses S. Grant in Riverside Park, replaced later by the permanent monument known as Grant's Tomb.

Besides being an architect and designer, Jacob Wrey Mould was a keen pianist and organist, and employed his talent for language in translating numerous foreign opera librettos into English. He is interred at Green-Wood Cemetery in Brooklyn, New York.

== External sources ==
Blog entry on Mould's translations, with a list of works.
