= Ashima Shiraishi =

American rock climber (born 2001)

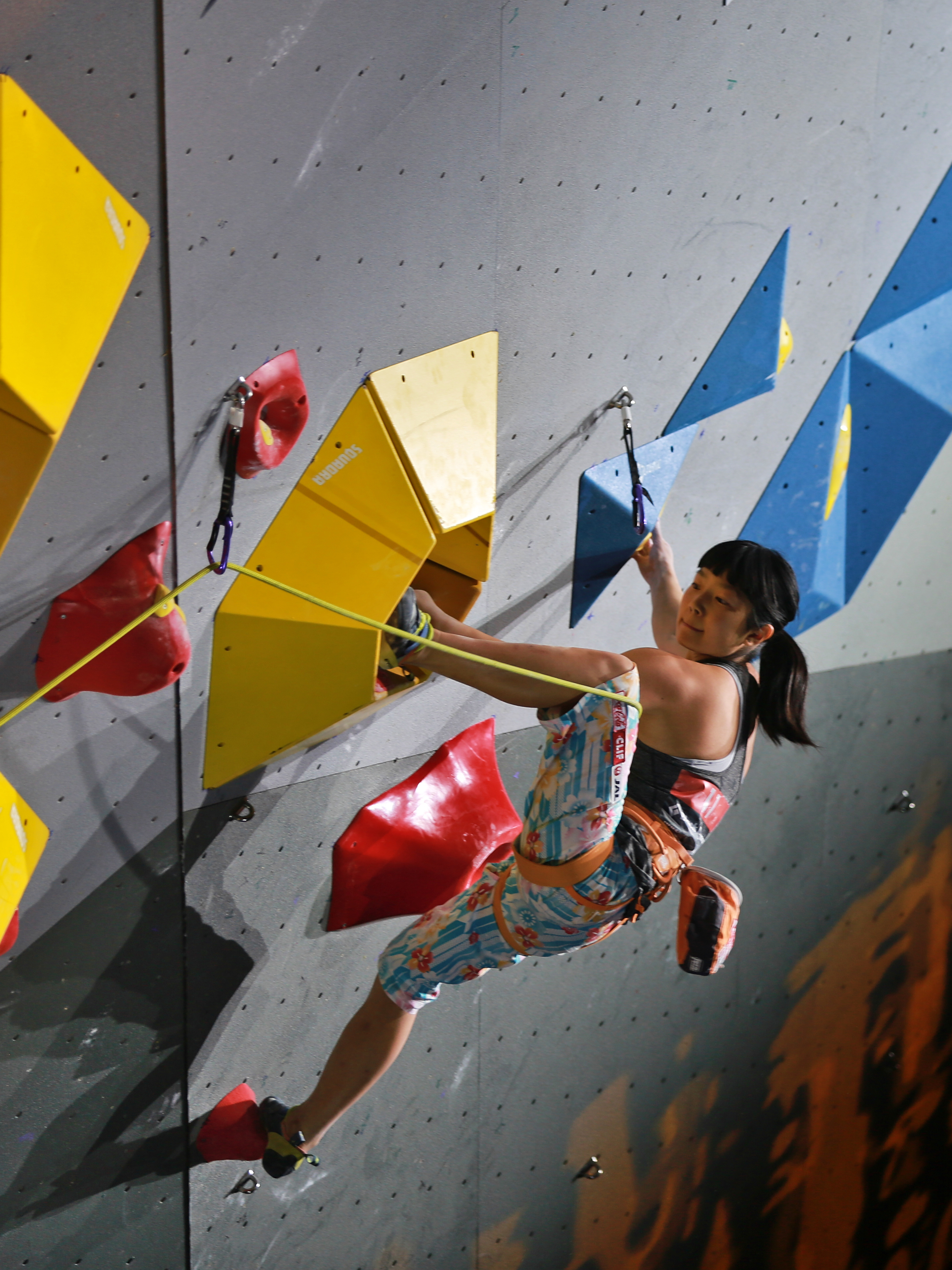
- Shiraishi at the Climbing World Championships 2018

Personal information
- Born: April 3, 2001 (age 25) New York City, U.S.
- Occupations: Student, rock climber, sport climber
- Height: 154 cm (5 ft 1 in)

Climbing career
- Type of climber: Competition climbing; Bouldering; Sport climbing
- Highest grade: Redpoint: 5.14d/5.15a (9a/+); Bouldering: V15 (8C)
- Known for: Youngest person to climb at 5.14d/5.15a (9a/+); First-ever female to climb a V15 (8C) boulder
Medal record
Women's competition climbing
Representing United States
World Cup
Silver medal – second place	2017 Xiamen	Lead
- Updated on October 31, 2017

Ashima Shiraishi (白石阿島, Shiraishi Ashima, born April 3, 2001) is an American rock climber. Shiraishi started climbing at the age of six at Rat Rock in Central Park, joining her father. Only a few years later, she quickly established herself as one of the top female boulderers, competition climbers, and sport climbers in the world. Her numerous accomplishments include first-place finishes in international competitions, and multiple first female and youngest ascents. Shiraishi is featured in several short documentary-style films, and is the subject of the documentary short "Return to the Red" (2012).

At age 13 she became the second-ever female, and youngest person, to climb a sport route with a difficulty grade of 5.14d/5.15a (9a/9a+). In 2016, she made the second ascent of Horizon in Mount Hiei, Japan and became the first-ever female to send a V15 (8C) boulder.

== Biography ==
Shiraishi was born in New York City on April 3, 2001. She is the only child of Tsuya and Hisatoshi Shiraishi, who immigrated from Japan in 1978 to New York City. Her father, Hisatoshi "Poppo" Shiraishi, was trained as a dancer in Butoh. Shiraishi grew up in Chelsea, Manhattan. When she was 6 years old, her parents took her to Central Park, where she started climbing at Rat Rock. She later climbed at Brooklyn Boulders in Gowanus, Brooklyn.

Shiraishi began climbing competitively at age 7, in 2008, and paired with coach Obe Carrion, an accomplished climber. Their partnership ended in 2012, largely due to tensions and disagreements between Carrion and Shiraishi's father, who has coached her since.

At age 8, Shiraishi climbed the classic boulder problem Power of Silence (V10), in Hueco Tanks, Texas. At age 9, she climbed Chablanke (V11/12) and Roger in the Shower (V11) in Hueco Tanks, and several other difficult boulders. At age 10, she climbed Fred Nicole's notorious Crown of Aragorn (V13) also in Hueco Tanks, and is the youngest person ever to climb this grade.

Shiraishi also excelled in lead climbing. At age 11, in October 2012, she climbed Southern Smoke at the Red River Gorge, a grade 5.14c (8c+) sport route, becoming the youngest person to climb a route of this difficulty.

In 2013, Shiraishi continued to excel at both bouldering and lead climbing, adding a 5.14a (Slow Food at Céüse) two more V13s (One Summer in Paradise and Automator) and finally two 5.14c's (24 Karats and 50 Words for Pump). In July 2014, she climbed what might be her first V14, Golden Shadow; however, there is a suggestion that Golden Shadow is V13 or V13/V14. She was the second officially recorded female climber (after Tomoko Ogawa) to successfully climb a V14 problem. On the first day of 2015, she climbed her second V14 (V13/V14), The Swarm, claiming the first female top-out of the problem.

At age 13, Shiraishi climbed her first 5.14d (9a), Open Your Mind Direct R1 in Santa Linya. The difficulty of the route had become harder while Shiraishi was attempting it, for a few months earlier a hold had broken off near the top leading to its reclassification as 5.15a. However, on Christmas Day of 2015, Edu Márin Garcia climbed the route past Shiraishi's end point to the second top and confirmed Shiraishi's route as a 5.14d (9a). In the same climbing trip, Shiraishi climbed Ciudad de Dios, making her the youngest athlete to climb a 5.14d/5.15a (9a/9a+) and the second female climber to climb at this level. The route has been climbed by 6 other athletes, but there is still no definite consensus on whether the grade is 5.14d or 5.15a.

In 2015, 2016, and 2017 Shiraishi won the IFSC World Youth Championships for both Lead and Bouldering in the Female Youth B category. In March 2016, at 14 years old, she climbed the boulder problem Horizon (8C/V15) in Mount Hiei, Japan. She is the second person ever to finish this problem. With this achievement she became the first female climber as well as, at the time, the youngest climber to climb this bouldering grade. (In 2019, Mishka Ishi overtook Ashima as the youngest person to climb 8C/V15.) A few months later, she climbed Sleepy Rave, another V15 (or V14 according to some), in Grampians National Park, Australia.

In 2017, she was the winner of the female sport category at the USA Climbing Sport & Speed Open National Championships (SCS nationals) held in Denver, Colorado, and placed second at the USA Climbing Bouldering Nationals (ABS nationals) to 10-time champion Alex Puccio. In the same year, she started competing in the Climbing World Cup as an adult.

In 2020 Shiraishi wrote How To Solve A Problem, an illustrated children's book with drawings by Yao Xiao.

She is sponsored by Evolv, Arc’teryx, Clif Bar, Petzl, Coca-Cola Japan, All Nippon Airways and Nikon.

In 2021, she enrolled at University of California, Los Angeles, studying neuroscience and environmental science.

She has been referred to as a "bouldering phenom" by the New York Times and as a "Gretzky of the granite" by The New Yorker.

== Rankings ==
=== World Cup ===
Discipline	2017
Lead	8

=== Climbing World Championships ===
Youth

Discipline	2015 Youth B	2016 Youth B	2017 Youth A
Lead	1	1	1
Bouldering	1	1	1
Speed	-	-	28
Combined	-	-	2

=== USA Open Championships ===
Discipline	2019
Bouldering	1
Lead	2

== Notable ascents ==
=== Boulder problems ===
8C (V15):

- Horizon - Mount Hiei (JPN) - 2015
- Sleepy Rave - Grampians National Park (AUS) - 2016

8B+ (V14):

- Jade - Rocky Mountain National Park (USA) - 2021.
- Phenomena - Hinokage (JPN) - 2015
- Nuclear War - New York City (USA) - 2015
- Golden Shadow - Rocklands (South Africa) - 2014

8B (V13):

- Wheel of Chaos - Rocky Mountain National Park (USA) - 2021
- Mana - Grampians National Park (AUS) - 2016
- Terre de Sienne - Hueco Tanks (USA) - 2015
- The Swarm - Bishop (USA) - 2015 - Some say this may be 8B/+(V13/14).
- Blood Meridian - Bishop (USA) - 2014
- Beta Move - Rocklands (South Africa) - 2014
- The Automator - Rocky Mountain National Park (USA) - 2013
- One Summer in Paradise - Magic Wood (CHE) - 2013
- Fragile Steps - Rocklands (South Africa) - 2012
- Steady Plums Direct - Topside (ZAF) - 2012
- Crown of Aragorn - Hueco Tanks (USA) - 2012 - Youngest person to climb the 8B (V13) difficulty.

Other Bouldering Achievements:

- The Shining - V12/13
- Lethal Design - V12 (8A+) - flash
- Chablanke - V11/V12 (8a/8a+)
- Roger in the Shower - V11 (8A)
- Power of Silence - V10 (7C+)
- Ashimandala - V8 (7B/7B+) - First Ascent (Age 7)

=== Redpointed routes ===
9a or 9a+ (5.14d or 5.15a):

- Ciudad de Dios - Santa Linya (ESP) - March 23, 2015 - First female ascent. The route has been repeated by several others, but they have not reached consensus about its grade

9a (5.14d):

- Open Your Mind Direct R1 - Santa Linya (ESP) - March 17, 2015 - First female ascent. The route was initially graded 9a (5.14d), but later a hold broke off leading to speculation that the route might have become harder, possibly 9a+. Shiraishi was the first climber who climbed it after the hold had broken. However, in December 2015 Edu Márin Garcia climbed the route past Shiraishi's end point to a higher top and confirmed the initial 9a (5.14d) rating for Shiraishi's route.

8c+ (5.14c):

- Southern Smoke - Red River Gorge (USA) - September 2012
- Lucifer - Red River Gorge (USA) - September 2012
- 24 Karats - Red River Gorge (USA) - October 2013
- 50 Words for Pump - Red River Gorge (USA) - October 2013
- La Fabela - Santa Linya (ESP) - March 2014 - First female ascent

8c (5.14b):

- Digital system - Santa Linya (ESP) - March 2014
- Rollito Sharma extension - Santa Linya (ESP) - March 2014

== See also ==
- History of rock climbing
- List of first ascents (sport climbing)
