= Heckscher Playground =

Playground in Manhattan, New York

Coordinates: 40.768732°N 73.977740°W

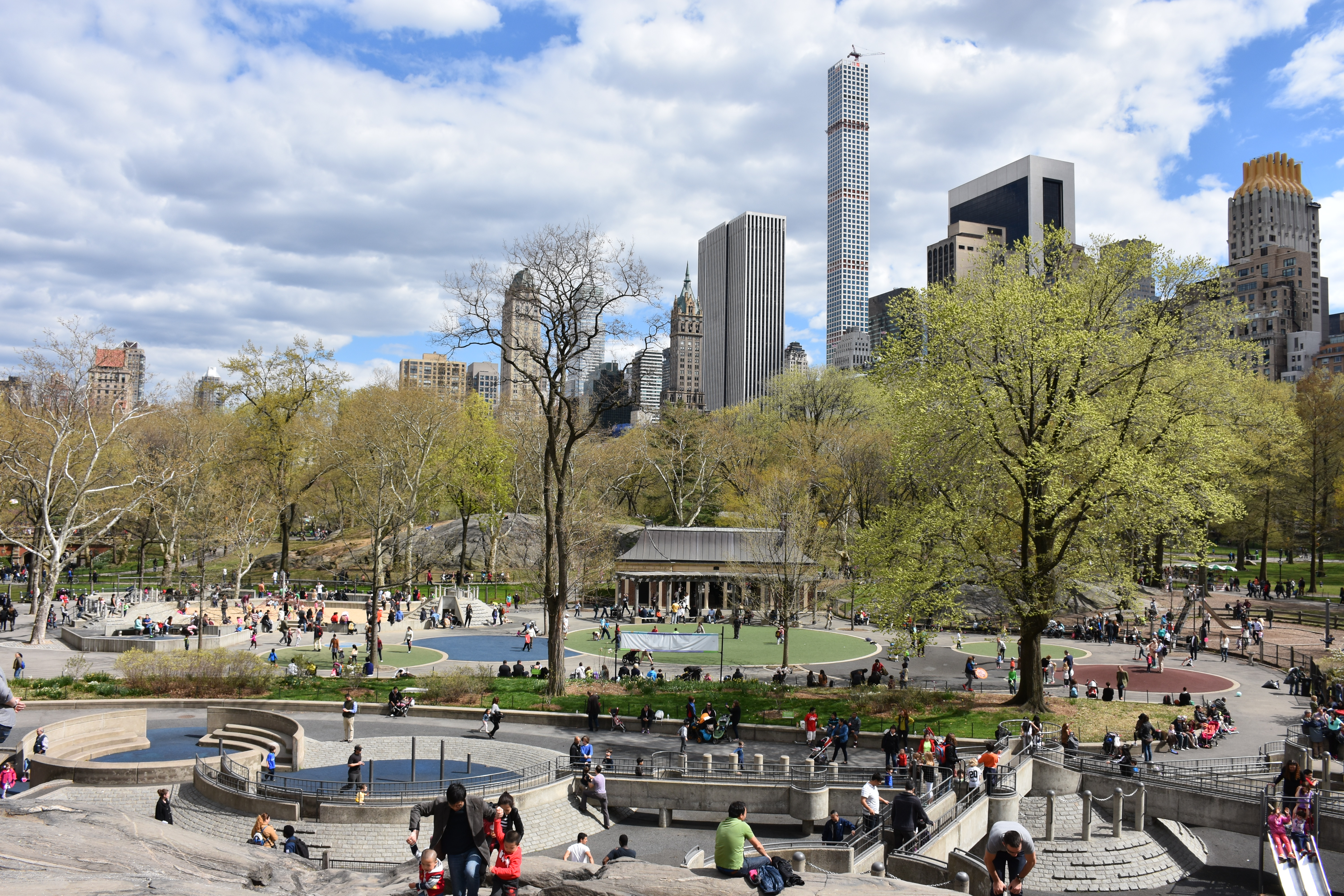
Heckscher Playground as seen from Rat Rock

Heckscher Playground is a play area located in New York City's Central Park, located close to Central Park South between Sixth Avenue and Seventh Avenue. It is the oldest and largest of Central Park's 22 playgrounds. (Note: While the Central Park Conservancy claimed that the playground currently covers 1.8 acres (0.73 ha), but initially used 10 acres (4.0 ha) acres of land when it was an open meadow designated for play. The New York Daily News mentioned in 1933 that the playground was 11 acres (4.5 ha). In 2011, The New York Times said that the playground was 4 acres (1.6 ha) when it opened as an official playground, and listed it as 1.24 acres (0.50 ha) in 2005.)

Opened in 1926, Heckscher Playground is named for philanthropist August Heckscher. Initially, it faced opposition from groups who did not want a playground within the Central Park landscape, but the playground grew popular with middle- and working-class families after its opening. Its success soon led to the construction of additional playgrounds in Central Park. Heckscher Playground has been rebuilt several times, including in the 1930s and twice in the 1970s.

== History ==
=== Planning ===
A design competition was held for Central Park in 1857; applicants were required to conform to several specifications, including at least three playgrounds of between 3 and 10 acres (1.2 and 4.0 ha). The winning plan, Frederick Law Olmsted and Calvert Vaux's Greensward Plan, included a play area called the Children's District in the southern part of Central Park. This area included the original Ballplayers House and the Dairy, both built in the 1860s. However, the early design of Central Park encouraged exercise and "individual recreation" over team sports and games, and as such, playgrounds and recreational fields were not originally included within the park. By 1914, only nine percent of the parkland was devoted to sports uses.

In April 1925, New York City park commissioner Francis D. Gallatin announced that 16 acres (6.5 ha) on the west side of Central Park would be set aside for a play area funded by the philanthropist August Heckscher, who was providing the money through the Heckscher Foundation for Children. The play area would contain a wading pool, six ballfields, and a grove of trees. The plans immediately drew opposition from several parties, including those who wanted to preserve the passive landscape of Central Park, and several other opponents who called Heckscher's gift "a private memorial". Yet others said that the mere presence of a children's play area would cause the condition of Central Park to deteriorate. In response, Heckscher said that the Central Park playground would show the wealthy "an idea of what a modern playground should be", while another playground that he funded near Mulberry Bend in Chinatown, Manhattan, would serve the poorer communities there. That May, mayor John Francis Hylan ordered the construction of the playground, and the city's Board of Aldermen rejected an aldermanic resolution that opposed the playground and other Central Park "encroachments".

=== Use ===
Notable buildings and structures of Central Park. Click on the map and then on the points for details.
'"`UNIQ--templatestyles-0000002A-QINU`"''"`UNIQ--templatestyles-0000002B-QINU`"'

Heckscher Playground opened near the southern end of Central Park on June 22, 1926. At the opening of his namesake playground, Heckscher announced that he would start a program to raise $3 million for Central Park improvements. His namesake playground quickly became popular with poor immigrant families. Most of the playground's users were lower- and middle-class families who came from further away. By 1933, Heckscher suggested the construction of additional playgrounds in Central Park. In 1934, work started on the extension of one of the park's bridle paths through the middle of Heckscher Playground. However, New York City parks commissioner Robert Moses ordered that the bridle path's construction be halted that May.

By 1935, the New York City Department of Parks and Recreation announced that the playground would be renovated. Among the proposed improvements were the construction of additional athletic fields; the landscaping of the wading pool; planting of additional trees; and installation of extra play structures. A proposal to remove the Heckscher Ballfields and relocate all baseball games to the North Meadow was overturned. Additionally, August Heckscher paid for a $15,000 memorial to social reformer Sophie Irene Loeb, one of the earliest supporters for a playground in Central Park. The renovation was completed in 1936. To make way for the playground's expansion, a bridge called the Oval/Spur Rock Arch was destroyed in 1934, and the bridle path through the playground was cut off. In addition, under Moses's tenure as parks commissioner, twenty-one additional playgrounds were built in Central Park by the late 1930s. Heckscher Playground became popular not only among children, but also among adults who used the various facilities for exercise.

Heckscher Playground was rebuilt again and reopened to the public in June 1970. At the time, the New York City Subway's 63rd Street lines were being built, with their planned routes running directly under the south side of Central Park. The city's parks commissioner, August Heckscher II (the grandson of the playground's namesake) expressed concern that the brand-new playground would have to be destroyed to make way for the excavation of the 63rd Street lines, located directly below the playground site. In early 1971, the subway system's operator New York City Transit Authority agreed to reduce construction time from three years to two years and construct a secondary play area just west of the existing playground. When demolition of the playground commenced in August 1971, just fourteen months after its renovation, several people protested against the construction of the subway lines directly under the brand-new playground. Even so, work continued on the subway project. Richard Dattner designed the secondary play space, a $250,000 "water playground", which opened in 1973. The restored Heckscher Playground was reopened by 1977, and Richard Dattner's water playground became part of Heckscher Playground.

The playground was renovated yet again in 2005. As part of the $3.5 million project, the adjacent restroom building was also restored, reopening to the public in 2007.

== Description ==
The Heckscher play area is located in the southern portion of Central Park, close to Central Park South between Sixth Avenue and Seventh Avenue. The playground proper covers 1.8 acres (0.73 ha), excluding the adjacent ballfields. It is bounded by the 65th Street transverse road to the north, West Drive to the west and south, and Center Drive to the east. Nearby park features include Sheep Meadow to the north, across the 65th Street transverse; Central Park Carousel and the Chess & Checkers House to the northeast; and the Dairy and Wollman Rink to the east, across Center Drive. Columbus Circle is located to the southwest, across West Drive.

Heckscher Playground consists of 14 swings, several slides, seesaws, a sandbox, and an open space made of artificial turf and rubber playground surfacing. In addition, it includes a large climbing structure with a water feature at the top, from which water flows downward into the climbing structure through a series of crevices. Spray jets for younger kids are located nearby. On the northern side of the playground, adjacent to the 65th Street transverse, there are six softball fields. Rat Rock, an outcrop of Manhattan schist popular among boulderers, is located just west of the play area and south of the softball fields.

A set of brick-and-limestone restrooms is located east of Heckscher Playground. They were built with the original playground in the 1920s, expanded in the 1930s, and restored in the 2000s.
