= Rat Rock =

Rat Rock may refer to

- Rat Rock (California), in the San Francisco Bay
- Rat Rock (Central Park), in Manhattan, New York City
- Rat Rock (Morningside Heights) in Manhattan, New York City

== See also ==
- Rock rat (disambiguation)
