= The Dairy =

Building in Central Park, Manhattan, New York

Coordinates: 40°46′09″N 73°58′25″W

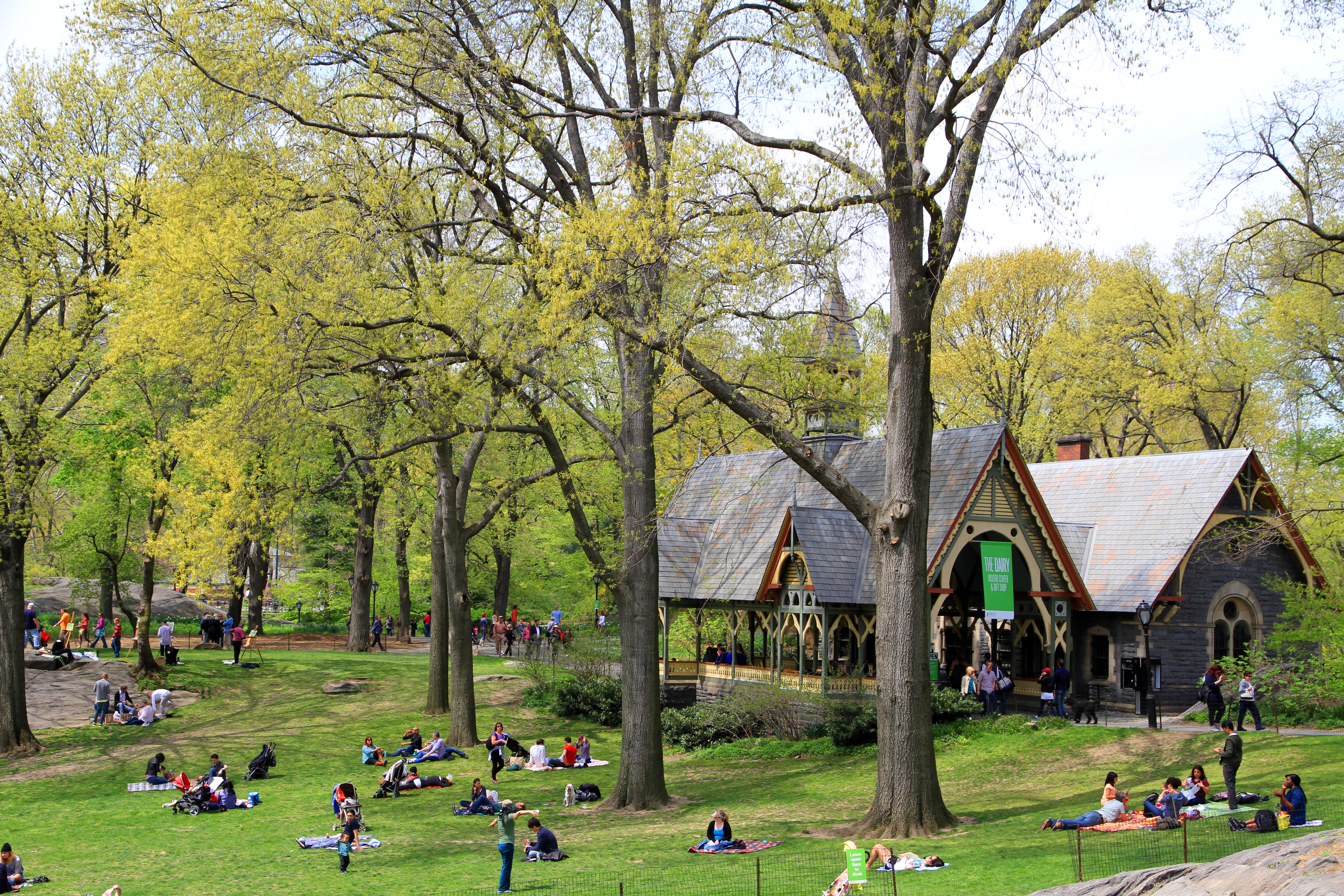
The Dairy, Central Park, in 2013

The Dairy is a small building in Central Park in Manhattan, New York City, designed by the architect Calvert Vaux. The building was completed in 1871 as a restaurant but is now one of the park's five visitor centers managed by the Central Park Conservancy, and also contains a gift shop. The Dairy is located in the southern section of Central Park just south of the 65th Street transverse road. Adjacent features include the Central Park Carousel and the Heckscher Playground and Ballfields to the west, Sheep Meadow to the northwest, Central Park Mall to the north, Central Park Zoo to the east, The Pond and Hallett Nature Sanctuary to the southeast, and Wollman Rink to the south.

== History ==
=== Design and construction ===
The Dairy was included in the Greensward Plan, the winner of the 1857 competition for the design of Central Park, but construction of the building only began in September 1869. In a progress report written by Olmsted Vaux & Co. to the Department of Public Parks, dated June 6, 1870, the architects stated, "The Dairy [is] a stone structure, the cellar of which connects directly with one of the traffic roads, it being the intention that the building should receive its main supplies from the exterior of the park. The Dairy is intended to serve as a refreshment room for adult visitors, and for the furnishing of supplies to parties of children who will congregate in the rustic shelter and in the play-grounds. The completion of this building, as designed in accordance with an estimate prepared in conjunction with the Architect-in-chief, will cost $3,000."

The Dairy was incorporated into the Children's District, which was not part of the initial plans for Central Park. The district also included Playmates Arch, Heckscher Playground and Ballfields, the Chess & Checkers House, the now-demolished Children's Cottage, and the Central Park Carousel. As originally planned, the Dairy would be used as a place to buy milk and other small snacks, as well as borrow board games. The cows that provided the milk would be housed in the cottage's basement. However, after an incident regarding the sale of tainted milk, more stringent regulations were instituted in the 1860s. The game loans ultimately became the purview of the Children's Cottage.

On the southern facade, a loggia or covered porch allowed visitors to enjoy the nearby Pond; the portion of the pond facing the Dairy is now occupied by Wollman Rink. The building also contains several Gothic Revival elements including a great hall with large church-like windows, a spire, and a roof with a steep pitch.

=== Decline ===
The Dairy was completed in 1871, and following political pressure from legislator William Tweed, was used as a restaurant. In 1921, the restaurant operator Eugene Glenn paid an annual fee of $12,250 for the franchise. In the 1930s, Park Commissioner Robert Moses converted it to a storage facility, and by 1950, the building was in decline. That year, a reporter for The New York Times wrote that, "untrimmed tree branches jut into its shingled roof," and "leader pipes have long since separated from the gutters and sag uselessly." The loggia of the Dairy was demolished in 1955. The building was later closed altogether due to the New York City fiscal crisis of the 1970s. In the interim, it was used as a maintenance shed.

=== Restoration and loggia reconstruction ===
Restoration of the Dairy was identified in 1978 by Parks Commissioner Gordon Davis as a demonstration project that could prove the capacity of the Parks Department to restore and manage the city's decrepit parks system. The idea was to build public support -- especially among the affluent neighbors of Central Park -- that would translate into both private funding and political support for increased municipal appropriations.

In 1979, the architects Weisberg, Castro Associates, following designs prepared in 1978 by the architect James R. Lamantia (1923–2011), restored the northern half of the structure, a renovation undertaken by the Central Park Community Fund and financed in part by Revlon, Inc. The renovated building reopened on November 17, 1979, with a polychrome information and sales desk designed by the architect Richard B. Oliver (1943-1985).

In 1981, the Central Park Conservancy rebuilt the loggia that had been demolished in 1955. The loggia reconstruction was designed by James R. Lamantia and the firm of Russo + Sonder.

=== Restoration (2020–2021) ===
In 2016, the Conservancy began raising funds for the restoration of several structures in Central Park, including the Dairy. In September 2020, the Conservancy closed the building for restoration, and reopened it in November 2021.

== Gallery ==
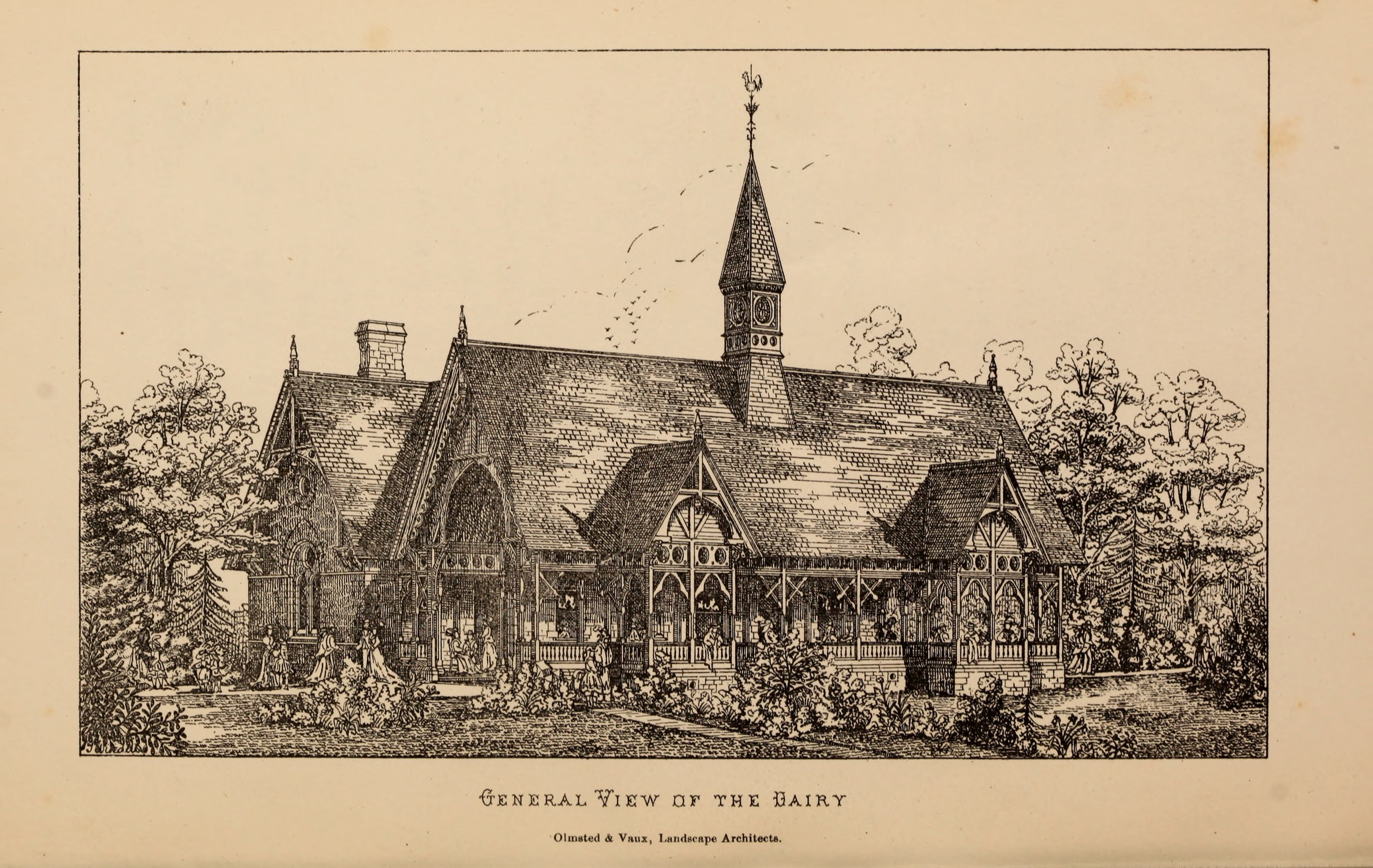
The Architect's sketch published in 1869.

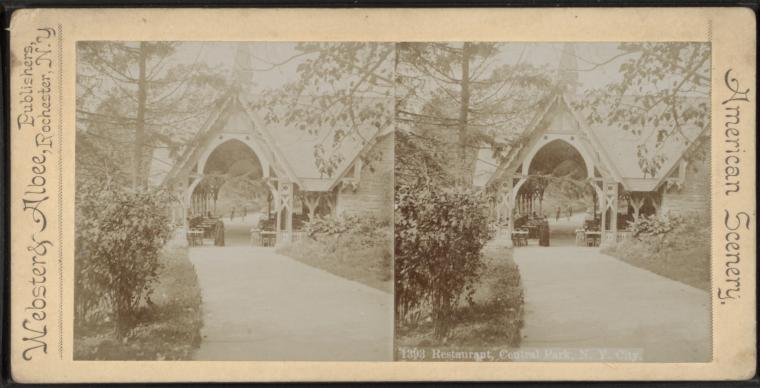
A stereoscope view of the Dairy (after 1870).

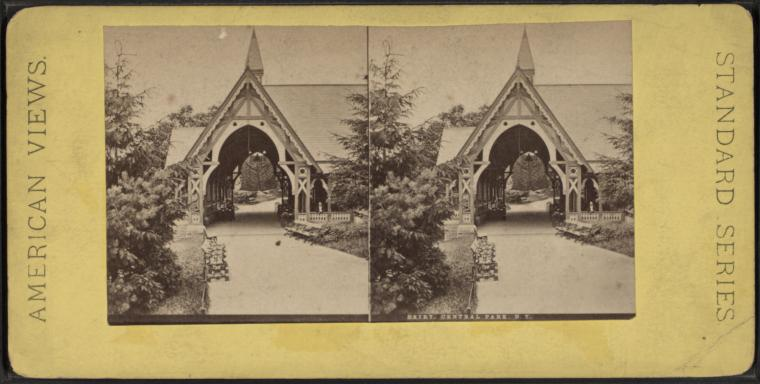
A stereoscope view of the Dairy (after 1870).

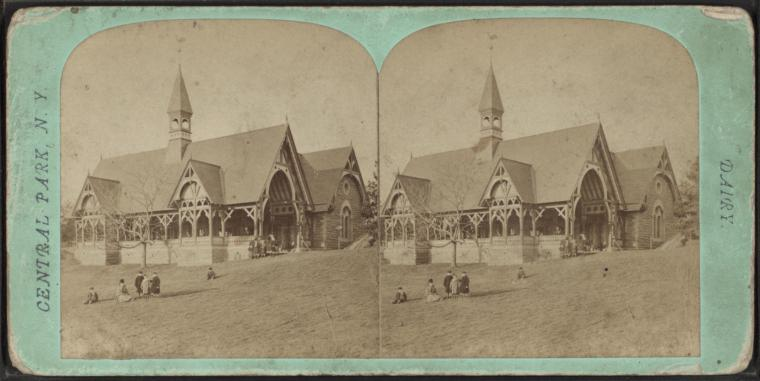
A stereoscope view of the Dairy (after 1870).

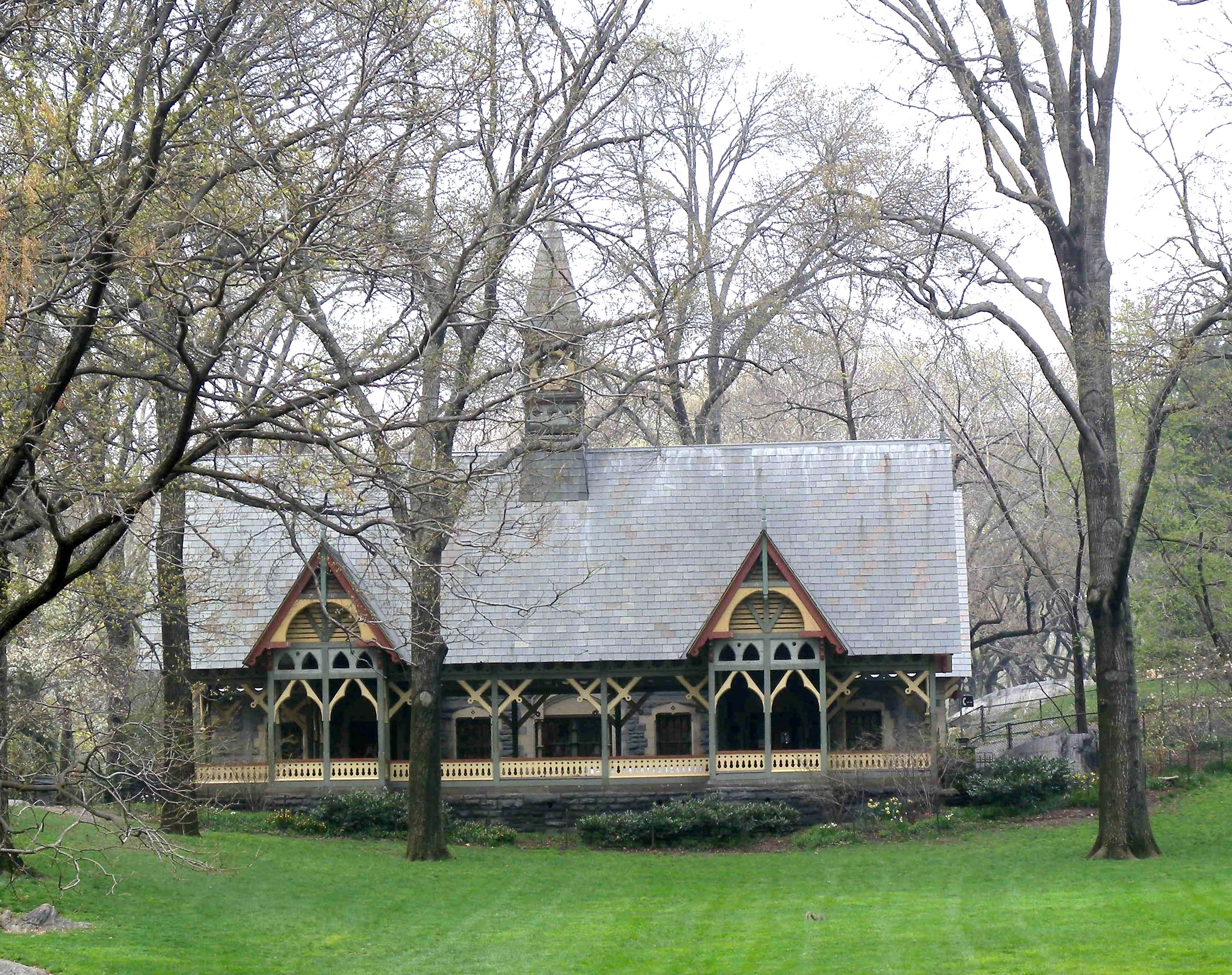
South facade of the Dairy in 2009.

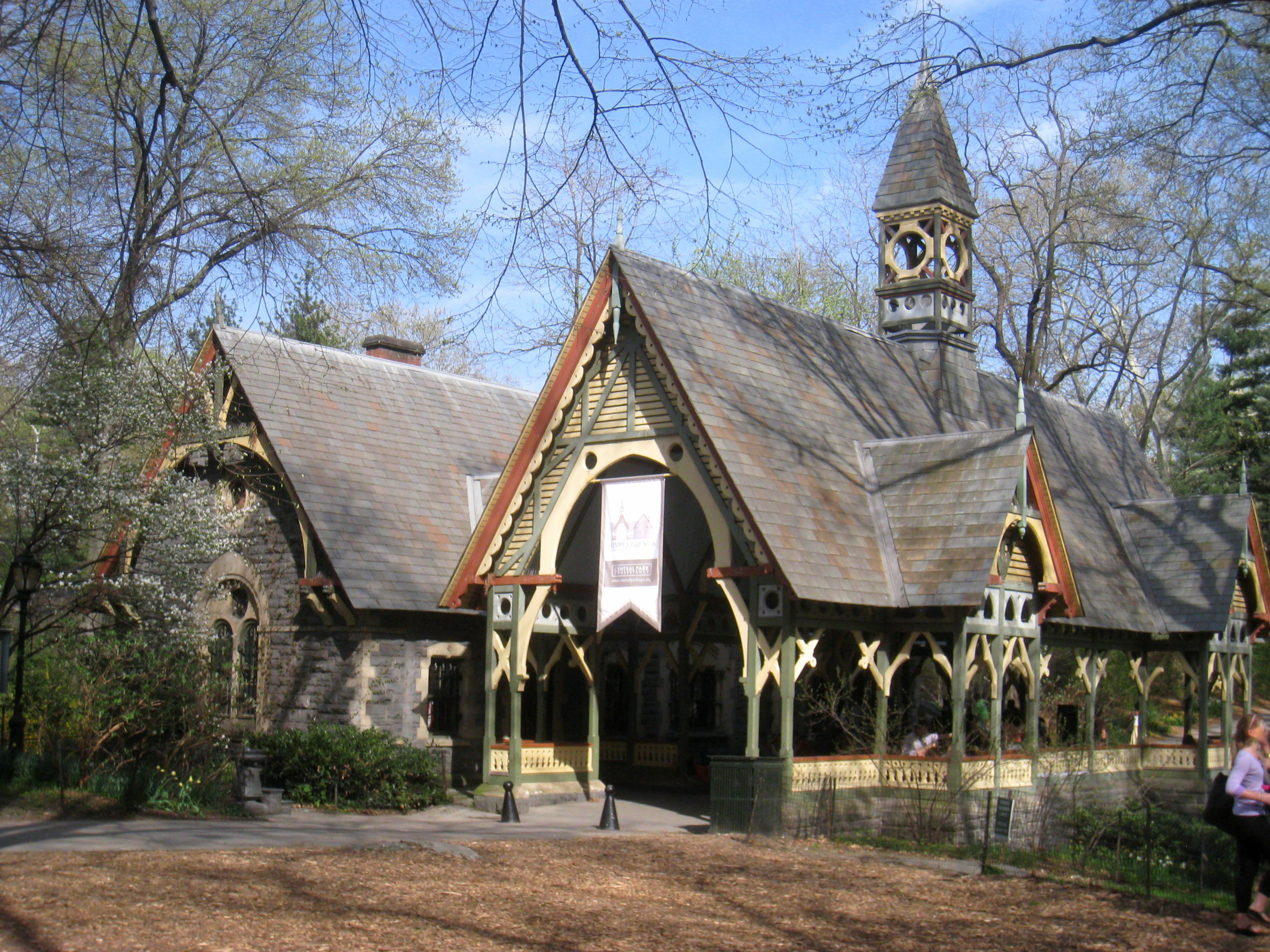
The Dairy in 2010.
