= Sheep Meadow =

Meadow in New York City's Central Park

Coordinates: 40°46′19″N 73°58′30″W

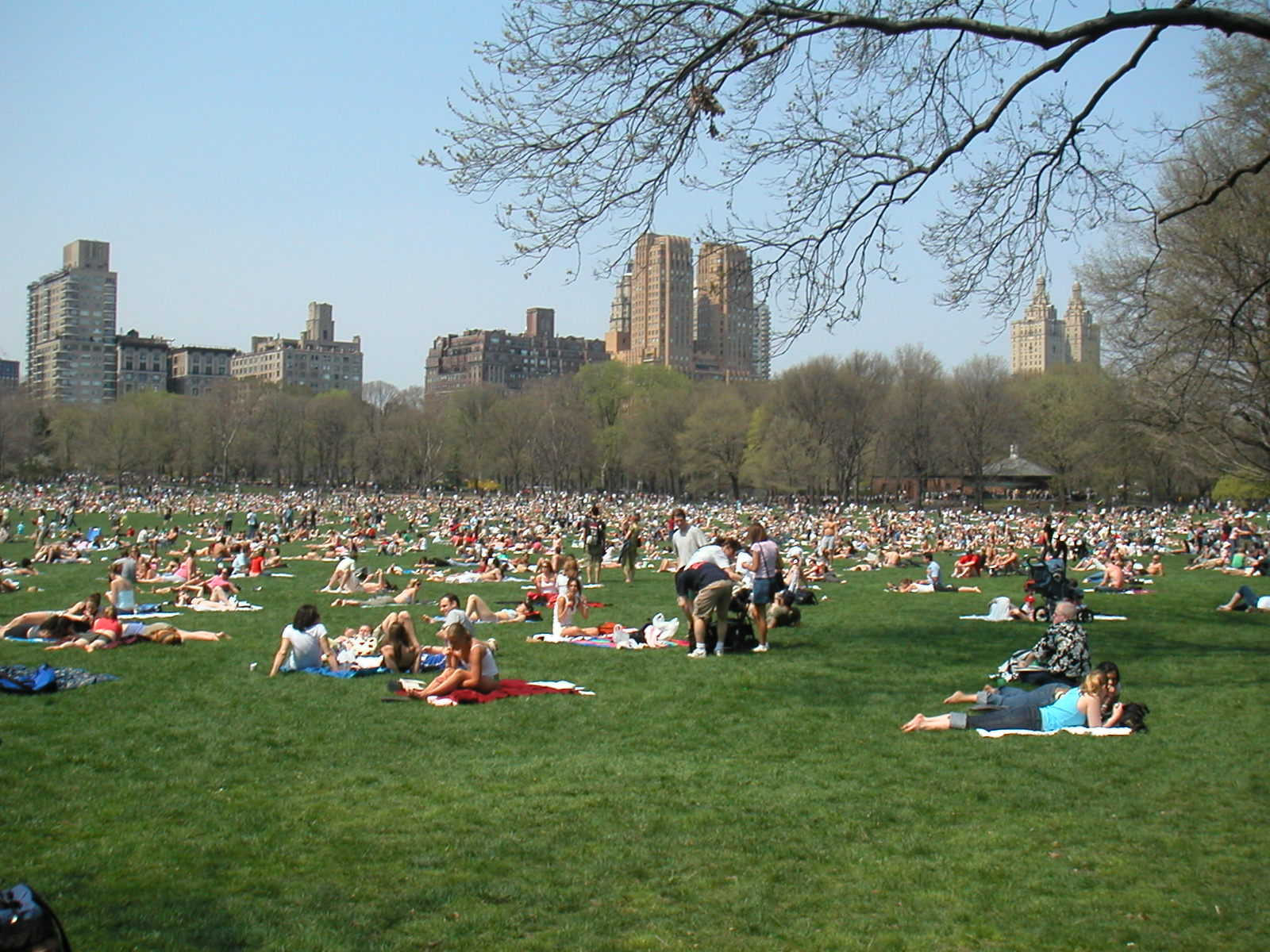
Parkgoers enjoying Sheep Meadow in April 2004

Notable buildings and structures of Central Park. Click on the map and then on the points for details.

Sheep Meadow is a 15-acre (61,000 m^{2}) meadow near the southwestern section of Central Park, between West 66th and 69th Streets in Manhattan, New York City. It is adjacent to Central Park Mall to the east, The Ramble and Lake to the north, West Drive to the west, and Heckscher Playground and Ballfields to the south.

Sheep Meadow was originally designed as a parade ground and incorporated into the Greensward Plan, the original plan for Central Park developed in the 1850s. However, Central Park's designers Frederick Law Olmsted and Calvert Vaux opposed the use of the meadow for military purposes, so it was instead converted to a pasture with sheep. Housed in a nearby sheepfold that now contains the Tavern on the Green restaurant, the sheep were removed in 1934.

Sheep Meadow has a long history as a gathering place for large-scale demonstrations and political movements. These have included festivals, rallies, concerts, and protests such as the be-ins of the 1960s. Though sports and gatherings were gradually allowed through the late 19th century, Sheep Meadow saw significant deterioration because of overuse. A regulation prohibiting sports was enacted following a 1980 renovation, and the meadow was restored again in 2000.

== History ==
=== Construction ===
In 1857 a design competition was held for Central Park. The applications were required to contain extremely detailed specifications, including at least four east-west transverse roads through the park, a parade ground of 20 to 40 acres (8.1 to 16.2 ha), and at least three playgrounds of between 3 and 10 acres (1.2 and 4.0 ha). The winning design was Frederick Law Olmsted and Calvert Vaux's Greensward Plan, whose name referenced a nineteenth-century term for broad open lawns. The plan offered a reduced parade ground on the western side of the proposed park.

When the location of Sheep Meadow was decided, some small communities of poorer New Yorkers were uprooted, including Irish, Germans and African-Americans. Sheep Meadow was to be located in a relatively flat 10-acre (40,000 m^{2}) patch of land within the park site. To produce the almost 15 acres (61,000 m^{2}) of "level or but slightly undulating ground" in the specifications, the ten acres of poorly-draining ground was filled to a depth of 2 feet (0.61 m) with fill from New Jersey. Additionally, large boulders and a rocky ridge that stood 16 feet (4.9 m) out of the finished grade were blasted out, and the reshaped landscape was covered with topsoil. Sheep Meadow was the most expensive project within the park. It was the largest meadow in Central Park until the old Croton Aqueduct collecting reservoir was emptied and made into the Great Lawn in 1937.

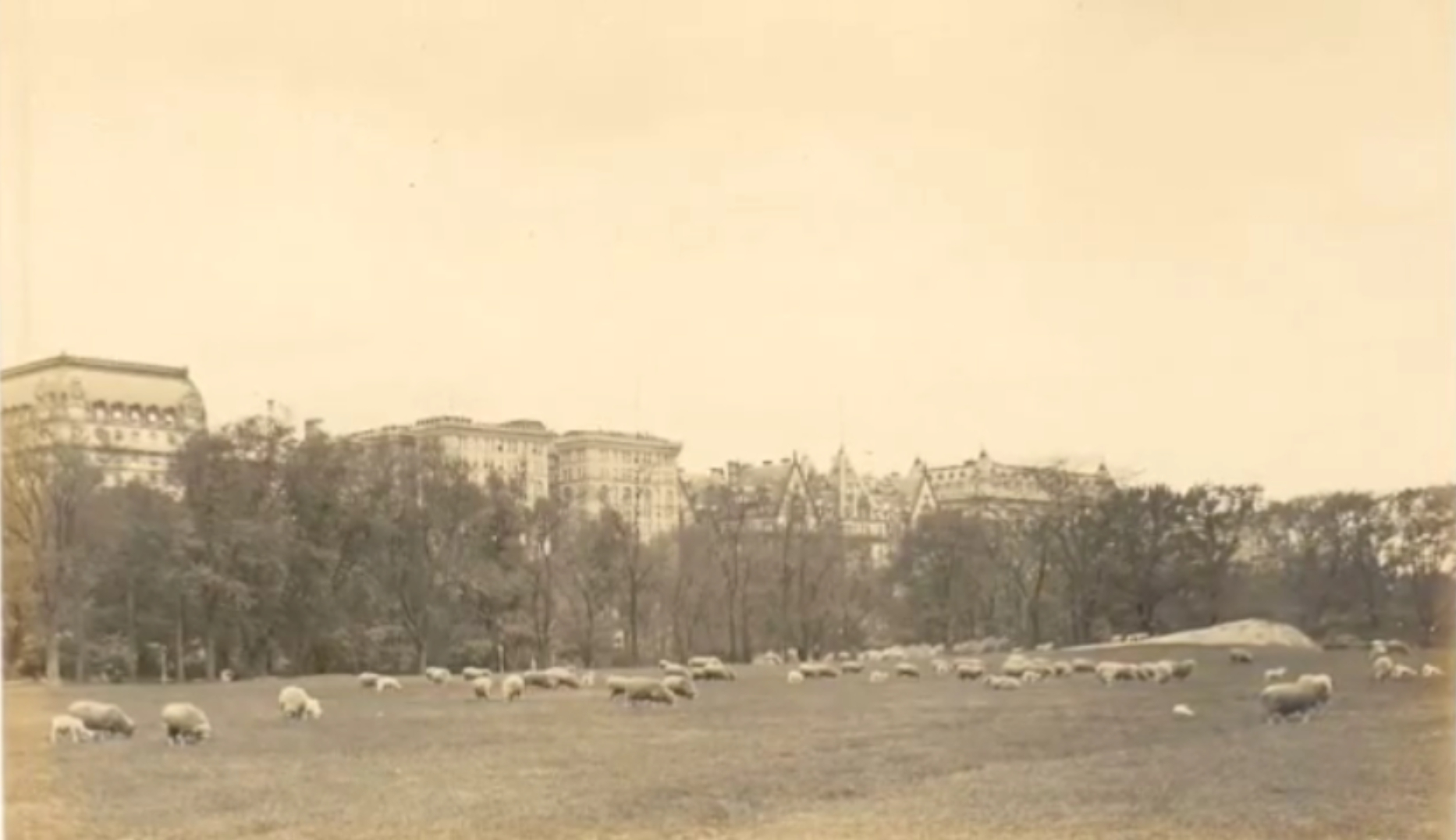
Grazing sheep in the first quarter of the 20th century

Despite Central Park's growing popularity, the park commissioners were loath to allow large events, especially military practices and picnics. The committee instituted a ban on military parades in the Parade Ground in 1865. In its place, Olmsted and Vaux believed that the introduction of sheep enhanced the romantic English quality of the park and to re-enforce the quiet nature of the "Greensward", 200 sheep were added in 1864. The flock of pedigree Southdown sheep were joined later by Dorset sheep.

The sheep were housed in a fanciful Victorian-style sheepfold created in 1870 by Jacob Wrey Mould under the direction of Calvert Vaux. The animals also trimmed the grass and fertilized the lawn. A sheep crossing was built across the drive, and twice a day a shepherd would stop traffic as the sheep traveled between the sheepfold and meadow. The Central Park commissioners would often sell wool and once a year would also auction off some sheep.

=== Conversion to open space ===
In its earliest years, Sheep Meadow was also known as "the Commons" or "the Green". For the first few decades of Central Park's existence, it was forbidden to play most sports in Central Park, because Olmsted and Vaux believed that the park should be used for scenic enjoyment rather than recreation. As such, in the park's earliest years, Sheep Meadow was only available to the public during certain times such as on Saturdays, as indicated on signs posted on the meadow's perimeter. By the 1870s, the park's patronage increasingly came to include the middle and working class, and strict regulations were gradually eased, such as those against public gatherings. Though certain sports such as lacrosse, tennis, American football, and roller skating were allowed during the 1880s, the commissioners were still reluctant to repeal the "keep off the grass" rules. However, by the 1890s, the regulations against walking on the grass had also been repealed. Tennis nets were installed in Sheep Meadow in 1915 due to the large number of tennis permits distributed by the city that year.

There were efforts to demolish the sheepfold as early as 1912, when it was suggested that the Lenox Library be relocated there. A subsequent proposal in 1921 called for a police garage to be built on the site. These efforts were not successful. By the 1920s, Central Park was undergoing minor renovations, and in 1928, part of Sheep Meadow was set aside for a plant nursery to store plants and trees that would be installed during these renovations.

At the same time, the successive generations of sheep in the meadow were supposedly inbreeding, leading to alleged deformities in later generations. In 1934, to make way for a restaurant in the sheepfold, park commissioner Robert Moses evicted the sheep from Sheep Meadow. The sheep were moved to Prospect Park in Brooklyn and soon thereafter moved to a farm near Otisville, New York, in the Catskill Mountains. After the sheep were removed, the sheepfold was converted into what later became the Tavern on the Green restaurant. The restaurant opened in October 1934.

=== Restorations ===
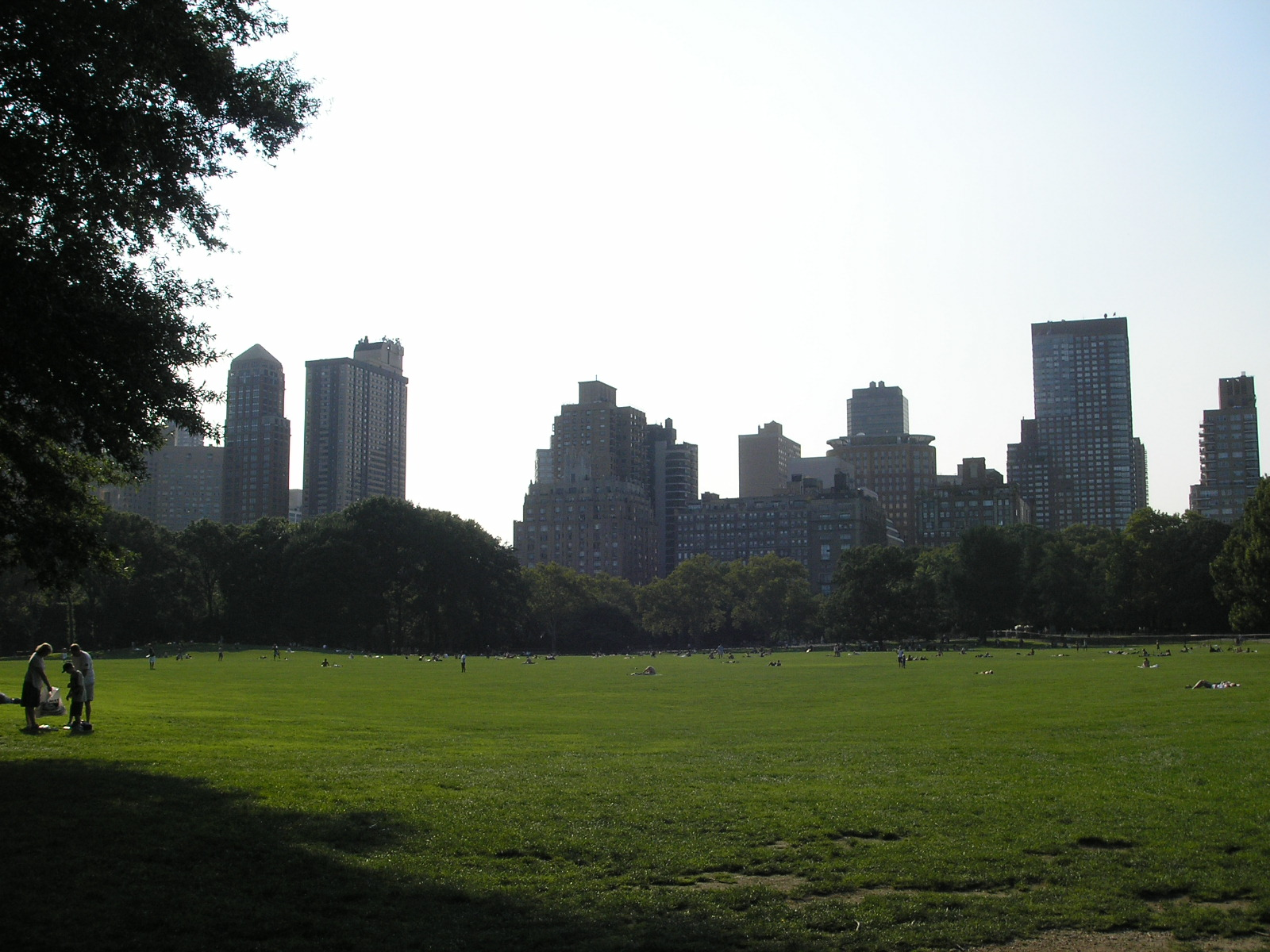
Seen in 2007

The large events and the lack of maintenance of the 1960s and 1970s severely eroded the lawn, and it was one of the first parts of Central Park to be restored by the Central Park Conservancy. This led New York state government to give $310,000 toward replacing Sheep Meadow's sod in 1979. With the help of James Taylor, who held a free benefit concert that July, the city renovated the meadow and installed a sprinkler system beginning in September 1979. The renovation was supposed to be completed within six or seven months, but because of discrepancies during construction, the grass began turning brown before the renovation was complete, and the reopening date was delayed. Sheep Meadow was reopened in September 1980. Once the lawn was reopened, team sports were banned and had to use the Great Lawn instead. In 1985, Sheep Meadow and four city beaches were designated as "quiet zones" where loud radio-playing was prohibited.

In 1992, a consortium of cheese producers brought a flock of sheep to graze on the meadow as a promotional stunt. They also pledged to finance the meadow's maintenance through 1993.

In November 2000, the Central Park Conservancy began the installation of a new irrigation system. The project, funded from a grant by the Marc Haas Foundation, was completed in five months, and Sheep Meadow reopened in April 2001.

== Features ==
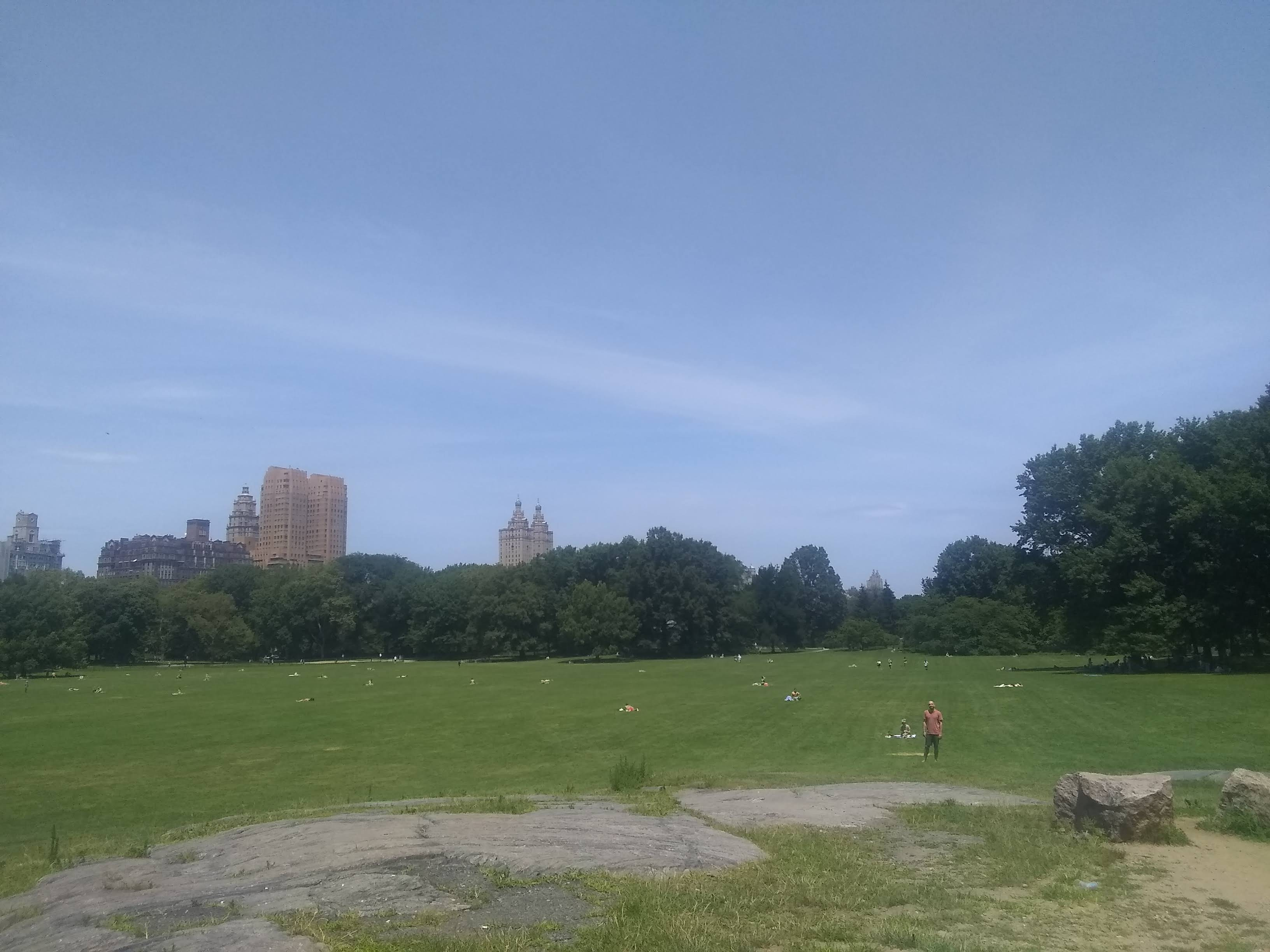
The southern portion of Sheep Meadow with rock outcrops

Sheep Meadow is on the western side of Central Park just north of the 65th Street transverse road. Adjacent features include The Dairy and Central Park Carousel to the southeast, Central Park Mall to the east, The Ramble and Lake to the north, Strawberry Fields memorial to the northwest, West Drive to the west, and Heckscher Playground and Ballfields to the south.

=== Mineral Springs ===
In 1865, Vaux and Mould designed the Moorish-style Mineral Springs Pavilion at the northwestern edge of Sheep Meadow. The Mineral Springs Pavilion had cusped arches supported on slender colonnettes, and flaring, complex roofs, reminiscent of Saracenic architecture. In 1957, park commissioner Moses demolished the structure.

The Mineral Springs Cafe was built on the site of the pavilion in the 1960s. In 2009, it became a cafe operated by Le Pain Quotidien.

=== Statues ===
There are two monuments and statues near Sheep Meadow. Giuseppe Mazzini (1878), a bronze bust by Giovanni Turini, overlooks the Meadow on a high pedestal. It honors Giuseppe Mazzini, an Italian patriot and revolutionary. The pedestal contains two Italian phrases, translated to "thought and action" and "God and the people". Indian Hunter (1869), created by American sculptor John Quincy Adams Ward, is on the east side of Sheep Meadow near the Mall. It was the first statue in Central Park created by an American artist.

== Notable uses ==
Sheep Meadow has held many large-scale events, and people have gathered for many uses. However, managerial neglect took a toll on the park's condition, and by the 1970s, the frequent festivals and concerts in Central Park were later identified as part of the cause for the park's subsequent deterioration. After the 1970s renovation, the open space of Sheep Meadow was surrounded by a chain link fence. The perimeter contains signs saying that team sports, ballplaying, bike riding, skating, glass bottles and dogs are prohibited. Frisbee, which is not explicitly prohibited, is often played at the park.

Sheep Meadow opens at 11 a.m. each day between April and October each year. The meadow is closed during winters to allow the sod to grow back. The Conservancy internally classifies Sheep Meadow as one of seven "A Lawns", indicating that it has the highest level of use out of the park's four classes of lawns. Sheep Meadow is heavily used: in 2009, it was utilized by 30,000 people each day. A survey conducted in 2010 found that the meadow saw three million people that year.

=== Past events ===
==== Early and mid-20th century ====
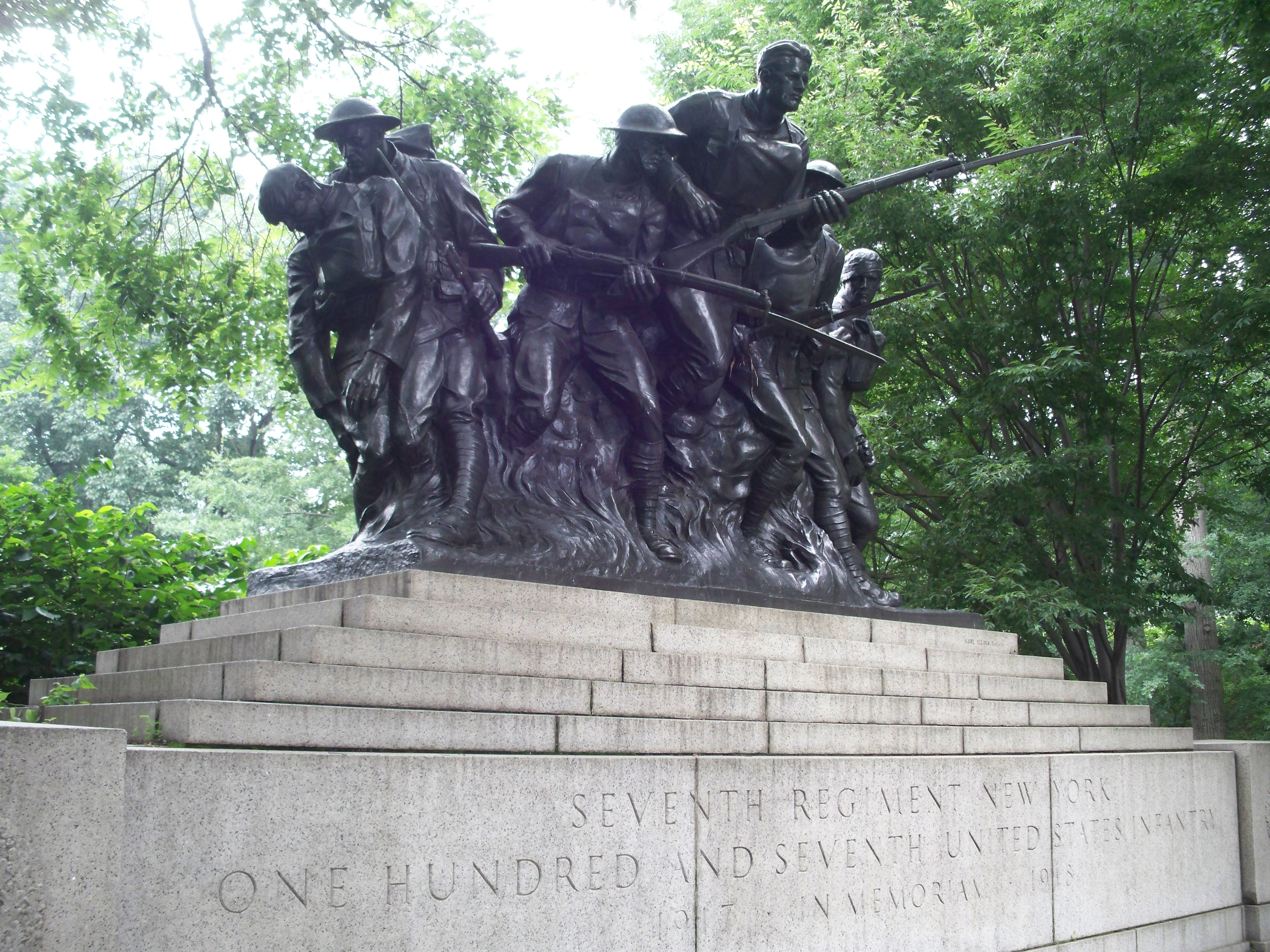
107th Infantry Memorial

In the early 20th century, the flock of sheep started sharing space with a variety of festivals and children's pageants, though political protests were not yet permissible. In 1912, an event called Around the World in Search of Fairyland featured children in brightly colored costumes. Children's competitions were also held in Sheep Meadow, such as playground contests and model airplane races. Starting in 1935, troupes of schoolgirls from the city's five boroughs competed at an annual concert attended by thousands of spectators. This practice continued even through World War II. Another popular festival was a Works Progress Administration sponsored event in 1936, attended by 25,000 people.

During World War I, Sheep Meadow was the site of patriotic wartime celebrations. In 1916, the 107th Infantry, the 7th Regiment Reserves, marched daily from their Park Avenue Armory to Sheep Meadow for maneuvers and drill, before being deployed that August. They are memorialized by the 107th Infantry Memorial, 600 yd (550 m) east of the Meadow at 5th Avenue and 67th Street. In 1917, 20,000 liberty war bond marchers participated in a "Liberty Day Parade" that ended in Sheep Meadow. The following year, there was a proposal to install trenches in Sheep Meadow as part of a wartime exhibition, the reason being that Sheep Meadow was in worse shape than North Meadow, the other large meadow in the park at the time. However, this was controversial because it was seen as detrimental to the naturalistic character of the park. The meadow was also used for patriotic gatherings during World War II. On October 27, 1945, Harry S. Truman spoke to 50,000 people at Sheep Meadow on Navy Day.

==== 1960s and 1970s: be-ins ====
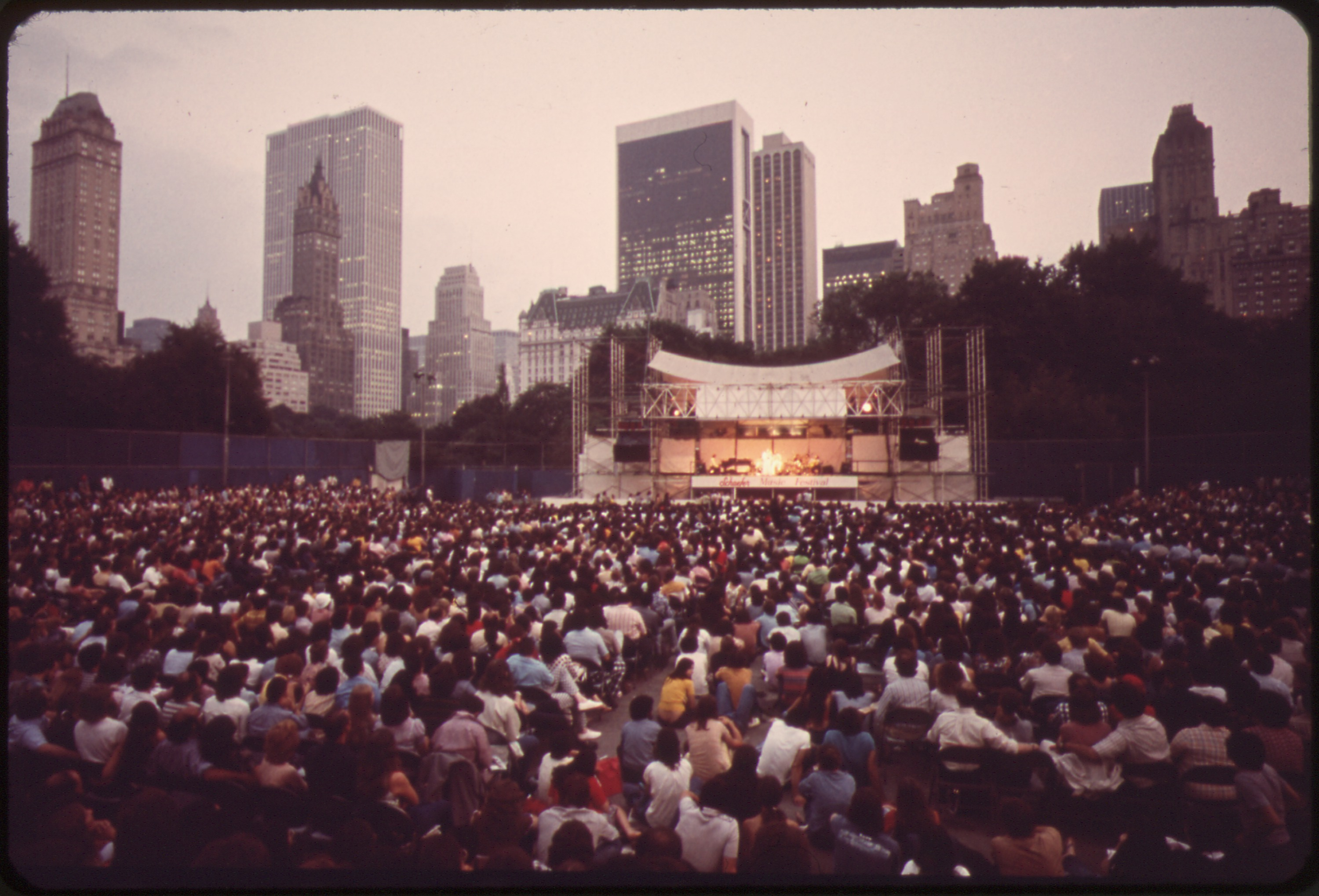
A concert for the singer Judy Collins

Starting in the 1960s, Sheep Meadow was used for events of unprecedented scale. Concerts, Vietnam War protests, and hippie "love-ins" and "be-ins" were attended by hundreds of thousands of people. The demonstrations included a "be-in style" peace demonstration attended by 10,000 people in March 1967, and an anti-Vietnam War rally attended by 400,000 people in April of that year. In Easter 1968, mayor John Lindsay, an opponent of the Vietnam War, met with protesters and marchers in an event attended by 90,000 people who assembled at Sheep Meadow. On June 28, 1970, there was a massive gay march and "be-in" that traveled from Stonewall Inn to Sheep Meadow to commemorate the first anniversary of the Stonewall riots. Another large Vietnam War protest march, which occurred in 1971 and included 20,000 protesters, marched up Sixth Avenue and ended at Sheep Meadow. These be-ins stopped by the 1970s as attitudes toward large protests in Central Park changed.

Other large gatherings included an event in 1969 when large crowds gathered to watch Apollo 11, the first crewed mission to land on the Moon. That same year, a group of 15,000 to 20,000 people assembled in Sheep Meadow for a bonfire event. This period was also marked by performances, such as a 1967 event where Barbra Streisand performed in front of 135,000 people, as well as summertime concerts in Sheep Meadow that each drew tens of thousands of people. Additionally, James Taylor's free benefit concert for the restoration of Sheep Meadow, hosted in July 1979, drew 250,000 people.

==== 1980s to present ====
In 1995, Disney paid the city government $1 million to show the New York City premiere of the film Pocahontas. Then in 1998, Disney rented the park area for a $105,000 fee, to have 1,300 children stand in formation, spelling out the name of the newly opened Disney's Animal Kingdom theme park. The scene was filmed from helicopters and from ground-level cameras set up outside Sheep Meadow.

For sixteen days in 2005, Central Park was the setting for Christo and Jeanne-Claude's installation The Gates. The opening ceremony for the installation was officiated by mayor Michael Bloomberg, who raised a long metal pole to release fabric from the top of a gate in Sheep Meadow. Although the project was the subject of mixed reactions, it was nevertheless a major attraction for the park while it was open, drawing over a million people.

=== Recurring events ===
The AIDS Walk New York, an annual event that draws up to 40,000 people, begins and ends in the Meadow. It started in 1986 and has since grown into one of the largest AIDS fundraising events ever, raising $139 million by 2015. After Sheep Meadow experienced extensive damage from the opening ceremonies for the AIDS Walk, NYC Parks determined that after the 2003 event this gathering could no longer take place in Sheep Meadow and would instead be held on the paved surfaces near the Bandshell in the Central Park Mall.

Since 1995, the NYC Urban Starfest has convened in Sheep Meadow on an ongoing annual basis. Sheep Meadow is reportedly one of the only open areas of Central Park "free of glare from local lighting and where almost the entire sky can be seen".

=== Emergency and other uses ===
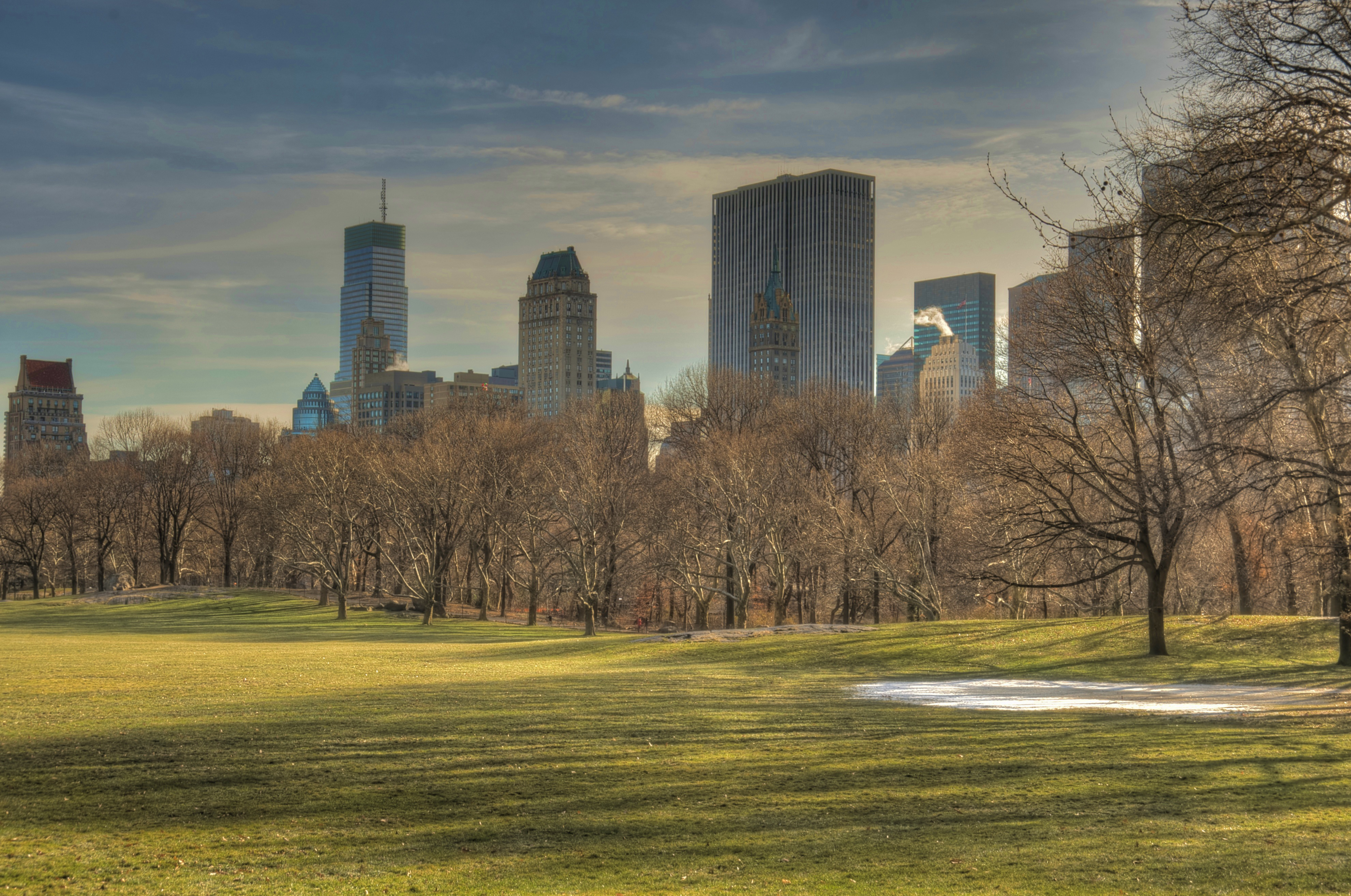
View of empty meadow in winter

At times the Meadow has been used for emergency helicopter air operations:

- On June 8, 1968, U.S. president Lyndon B. Johnson flew in and out of New York in a helicopter to attend Robert F. Kennedy's funeral at St. Patrick's Cathedral.
- In 1986, emergency services met a helicopter carrying a heart patient from Smithtown, Long Island, in Sheep Meadow, The patient was destined for the New York Hospital-Cornell Medical Center on the Upper East Side.
- Following the September 11 attacks in 2001, Black Hawk helicopters used Sheep Meadow as a base of operations. At one point, a portable air traffic control tower was assembled there.

At least one child is said to have been born in Sheep Meadow. Isidore Block, known locally as a street poet, has stated that he was born in Sheep Meadow in 1920.

== Use in media ==
Film and television production is allowed on Sheep Meadow only with an official permit and when it is open. The meadow is open for production in dry weather from May through October, from 11 a.m. to dusk.

Beginning with Romeo and Juliet in 1908, films such as Odds Against Tomorrow (1959), It Could Happen To You (1994), The Fisher King (1991), Wall Street (1987), Ghostbusters (1984), Enchanted (2007), and The Manchurian Candidate (1962) have used Sheep Meadow as a setting. The meadow has been used for scenes depicting romantic moments, large dance numbers, and car chases. The director Mark Levin wanted to fill Sheep Meadow with sheep for a scene in his 2005 romance Little Manhattan. After NYC Parks refused this request, the filmmakers placed temporary sod along the path surrounding the meadow, then filmed the sheep atop the temporary sod.
