= Love-in =

Peaceful public gathering

A love-in is a peaceful public gathering focused on meditation, love, music, sex, or use of recreational drugs. The term was coined by Los Angeles radio comedian Peter Bergman, creator of comedy group The Firesign Theater, who also hosted the first such event on Easter, March 26, 1967, in Elysian Park, Los Angeles.

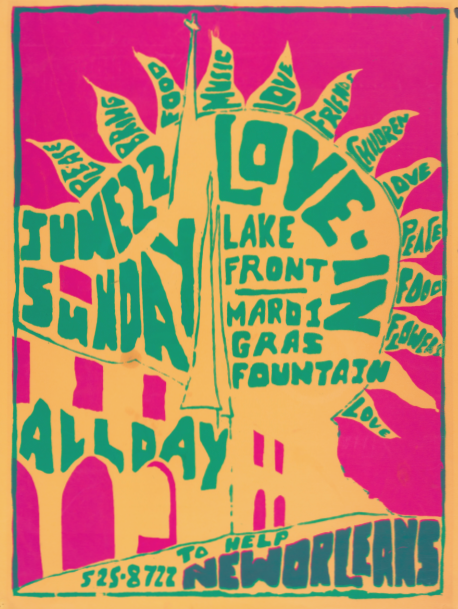
Poster for a Love-In in New Orleans, 1969

== The term ==
The term love-in has been interpreted in varying manners, but is often connected to protesting local, social or environmental issues. Such protests were often held in opposition to the Vietnam War. As such, love-ins are largely considered a staple of the 1960s hippie counterculture.

More recently the term is occasionally used figuratively to describe a situation in which people shower praise on one another in excess.

== Background ==
The First Love-in was preceded by the Heavenly Happening, at midnight on November 16, 1966 on the Sheep Meadow in Central Park, organized by the New York Parks Commissioner, Thomas Hoving.

== January 1967 Human Be-In ==
The Human Be-In at the Polo Fields in San Francisco's Golden Gate Park on January 14, 1967.

== First Love-in on Easter in Elysian Park ==
The First Love-in started before dawn. The Los Angeles Free Press promoted the event. 15,000 people crowded in a natural amphitheater in Elysian Park, and listened to the psychedelic rock bands Strawberry Alarm Clock, The Peanut Butter Conspiracy, Clear Light, and the Flamin' Groovies.

== 1967 New York Easter Be-in ==
The New York Easter 1967 be-in was organized by Jim Fouratt, an actor; Paul Williams, editor of Crawdaddy! magazine; Susan Hartnett, head of the Experiments in Art and Technology organization; and Chilean poet and playwright Claudio Badal.

== 1967 Cambridge Common Concerts ==
Founded in 1967 at Harvard Square by J. Robert "Bob" Gordon, it recurred for nearly eight years, until 1975.

== See also ==
- Central Park be-in
