= Rat Rock (Morningside Heights) =

Rock formation in Manhattan, New York

- Schist outcrop
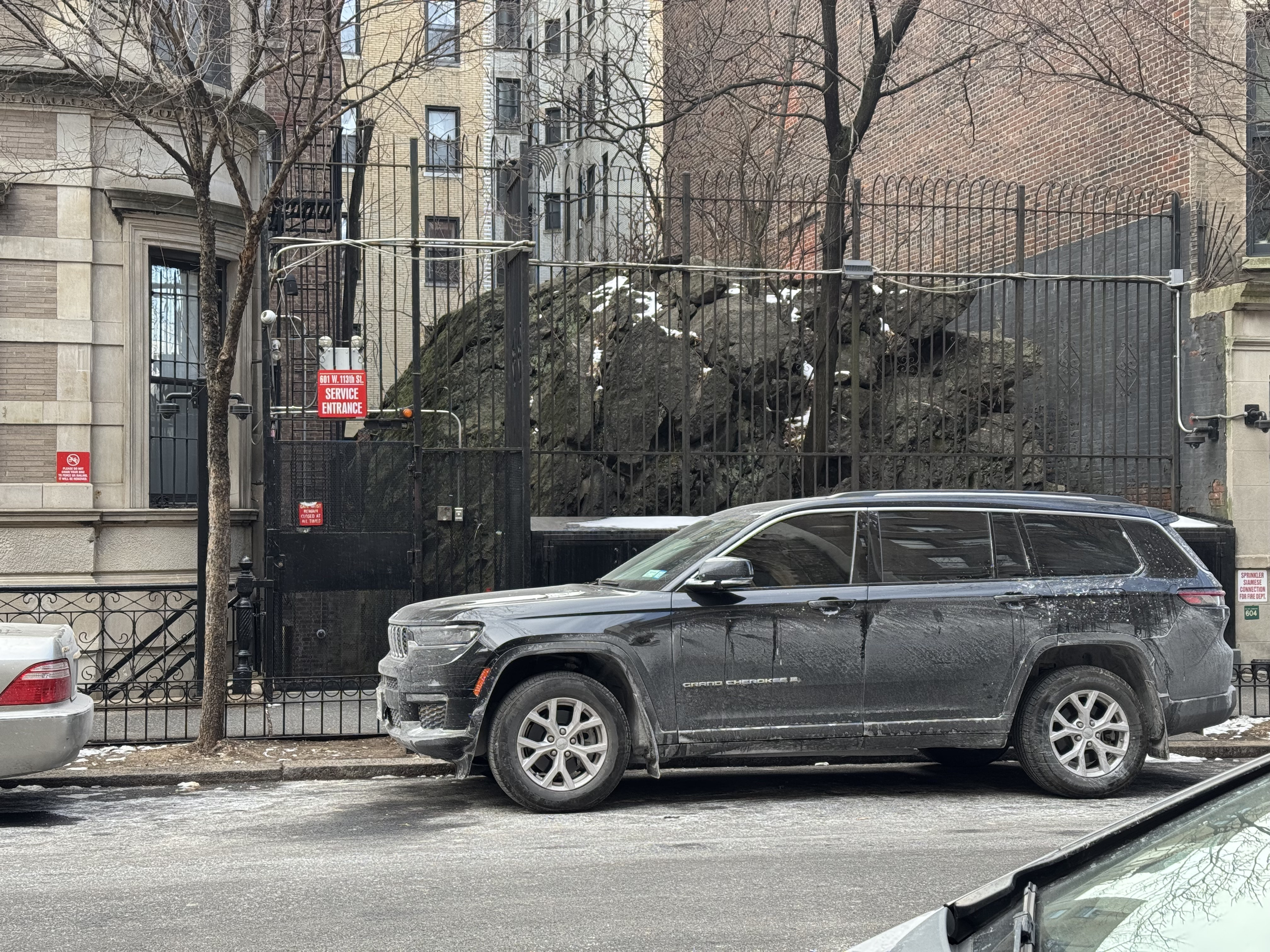
- View from West 114th Street

- Location of Rat Rock Rat Rock (the United States)
- Coordinates: 40°48′24.8″N 73°57′55.8″W
- Location: Morningside Heights, Manhattan, New York City, New York, U.S.

Rat Rock is an outcrop of Manhattan schist between 600 and 604 West 114th Street in the Morningside Heights neighborhood of Manhattan, New York City.

== Description ==
The boulder measures approximately 30 feet (9.1 m) high and 100 feet (30 m) long; it is notable as one of the only remaining such rocks in Manhattan's street grid. It was named Rat Rock for the large number of rats nesting in it, similar to the other Rat Rock in Central Park.

The row houses around it were built in the 1890s, when land in Manhattan was significantly less valuable. Though the land on which it sits has greatly appreciated in value, Columbia University, which owns Rat Rock along with most of West 114th Street, has no plans to remove it, as it has been estimated that removing the rock could cost hundreds of thousands of dollars. The university placed a fence around it to prevent vandalism. Columbia professor Andrew Dolkart described it as "an extraordinary survivor" of New York City's development, because it "hints at the geology of the city", and The New York Times labelled it one of New York's "most amazing natural wonders".
