= Tomoko Ogawa =

Japanese boulderer (born 1978)

Personal information
- Nationality: Japanese
- Born: April 14, 1978 (age 48)
- Height: 5 ft 3 in (160 cm)
- Weight: 106 lb (48 kg)

Climbing career
- Type of climber: Bouldering
- Highest grade: Bouldering: V14 (8B+)
- Major ascents: Catharsis
- Known for: First-ever woman to climb V14 (8B+)

Tomoko Ogawa (尾川 智子, Ogawa Tomoko; born April 14, 1978) is a Japanese boulderer. In 2012, she sent Catharsis, a boulder route in Shiobara established by Dai Koyamada, and confirmed by Daniel Woods, to become the first-ever woman to climb an 8B+ (V14) route. Ogawa began climbing in 2000, at age 22. Her other notable ascents of boulders include Caramba 8A+ (V12), Mutante 8A+ (V12), Akugeki 8A/8A+ , Atomic Playboy 8A (V11), Hatchling 8A (V11), and No Late Tenders 8A (V11).

== See also ==
- Katie Lamb, first-ever female to climb an 8C+ (V16) graded boulder
- Ashima Shiraishi, first-ever female to climb an 8C (V15) graded boulder
- Angie Payne, first-ever female to climb an 8B (V13) graded boulder
