= Rock rat =

The term rock rat has been used for several different types of rodents:

- Members of the family Muridae:
  - Zyzomys, an Australian genus in the subfamily Murinae
  - Aethomys, an African genus in the subfamily Murinae
- Members of the family Nesomyidae:
  - Petromyscus, a southwestern African genus in the subfamily Petromyscinae (though these are more frequently referred to as rock mice)
- Members of the family Octodontidae:
  - Aconaemys, a genus in Argentina and Chile
- Members of the family Petromuridae:
  - Petromus, an African genus often called dassie rats.
- Members of the family Diatomyidae:
  - Laonastes, a genus from Laos

== See also ==
- Rat Rock (disambiguation)
