= Victorian Gardens =

Seasonal amusement park in New York City

Coordinates: 40°46′4″N 73°58′28″W

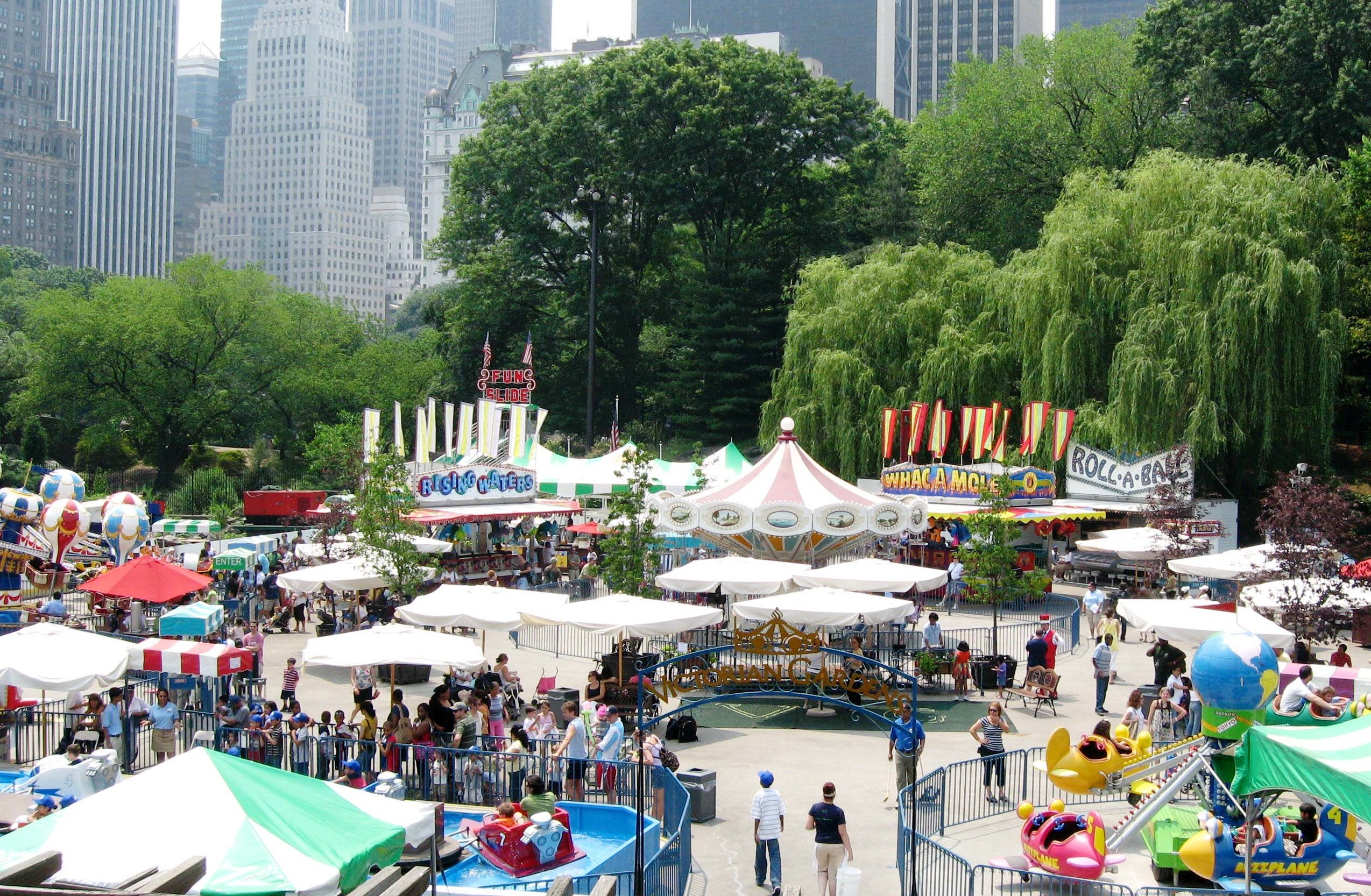
Victorian Gardens in 2008, with the skyscrapers of Central Park South (59th Street) and Fifth Avenue in the background

Notable buildings and structures of Central Park. Click on the map and then on the points for details.

Victorian Gardens was a seasonal traditional-style amusement park that set up at Wollman Rink in Central Park, Manhattan, New York City, from spring through fall each year.

== Description ==
The 50,000-square-foot (4,600 m^{2}) facility, which started operating in spring 2003, accommodated up to 3,000 guests and featured about a dozen rides geared primarily to ages 2–12. In addition to the rides, the park offers activities including face painting, balloon sculpting, interactive games and live entertainment, including clowns and magic shows, on weekends and holidays.

== History ==
The idea to put an amusement park in the Wollman Rink came from a small group of industry veterans who saw an opportunity to use the 50,000 square foot facility all year long. After negotiations with the Central Park Conservancy, the New York City Parks Department and the Trump Organization, these private investors established Central Amusement International (CAI), which turned to Zamperla, an Italian amusement ride manufacturer, to put the ideas into play. Victorian Gardens first opened its gates to the general public in 2003.

Due to operating restrictions caused by the COVID-19 pandemic in New York City, Victorian Gardens did not open for the 2020 season and never reopened.

Following the city's termination of all contracts with the Trump Organization in early 2021, CAI took over the operations of the nearby Central Park Carousel and plans were made to transform Wollman rink's warm season into other activities operated by other concessions. Albert Zamperla died in November 2022.
