= Brooklyn Boulders =

American adventure lifestyle company

- Type: Private
- Industry: Fitness, Indoor climbing, Recreation, Coworking
- Founded: September 9, 2009; 17 years ago
- Founder: Lance Pinn; Jeremy Balboni
- Headquarters: United States
- Number of locations: Brooklyn, New York; Somerville, Massachusetts; Chicago, Illinois; Queens, New York
- Area served: United States
- Key people: Lance Pinn (President and Co-Founder); Jeremy Balboni (Chief Executive Officer)
- Products: Indoor climbing gyms; Fitness and coworking spaces; Adventure lifestyle services
- Brands: Brooklyn Boulders (BKB); Adaptive Climbing Group (ACG); The Hueco Hacienda
- Owner: Private ownership
- Number of employees: 200+ (approx.)
- Website: brooklynboulders.com

Brooklyn Boulders (BKB) is an adventure lifestyle company that builds and operates urban climbing, fitness, and community centers.

== History ==
Brooklyn Boulders was founded in 2009 and is currently operated by Lance Pinn, President and Co-Founder, and Jeremy Balboni, Chief Executive Officer. Construction began in March 2009 and on September 9, 2009, the first Brooklyn Boulders location opened in the old Daily News garage on Third Avenue in Gowanus. BKB Gowanus is a 18,000-square-foot (1,700 m^{2}) climbing facility—the first of its kind in New York City.

On July 31, 2013, Brooklyn Boulders opened their second location, Brooklyn Boulders Somerville, "a 40,000-square-foot climbing facility; a hybrid climbing and fitness facility collaborative workspace in Somerville, Massachusetts." Soon after, Brooklyn Boulders opened its first location in the Midwest. They opened Brooklyn Boulders Chicago on December 13, 2014, located in Chicago's West Loop. Brooklyn Boulders Chicago features "a 1,000-square-foot Active Collaborative Workspace", with standing desks, exercise-ball sitting desks, and above-desk pull-up bars."

== Brooklyn Boulders Foundation (BKBF) ==
Brooklyn Boulders Foundation (BKBF) is a 501(c)(3) public charity founded in 2010. BKBF includes the Adaptive Climbing Group and City Rocks.

=== Adaptive Climbing Group ===
Brooklyn Boulders is home to the Adaptive Climbing Group (ACG), founded by climber and adaptive athlete Kareemah Batts.

== The Hueco Hacienda ==
The Hueco Hacienda is Brooklyn Boulders’ lodging facility located in the Chihuahuan Desert, 15 miles outside of El Paso, Texas, and approximately one mile from Hueco Tanks State Park and Historic Site. The Hacienda provides climbers and guests a place to stay after climbing and hiking at Hueco Tanks. Visitors have access to hiking trails, bouldering, and backcountry tours.
