= Central Park be-ins =

1967–1970 demonstrations in New York City

- Part of Gay liberation, the Hippie movement, and the Opposition to U.S. involvement in Vietnam
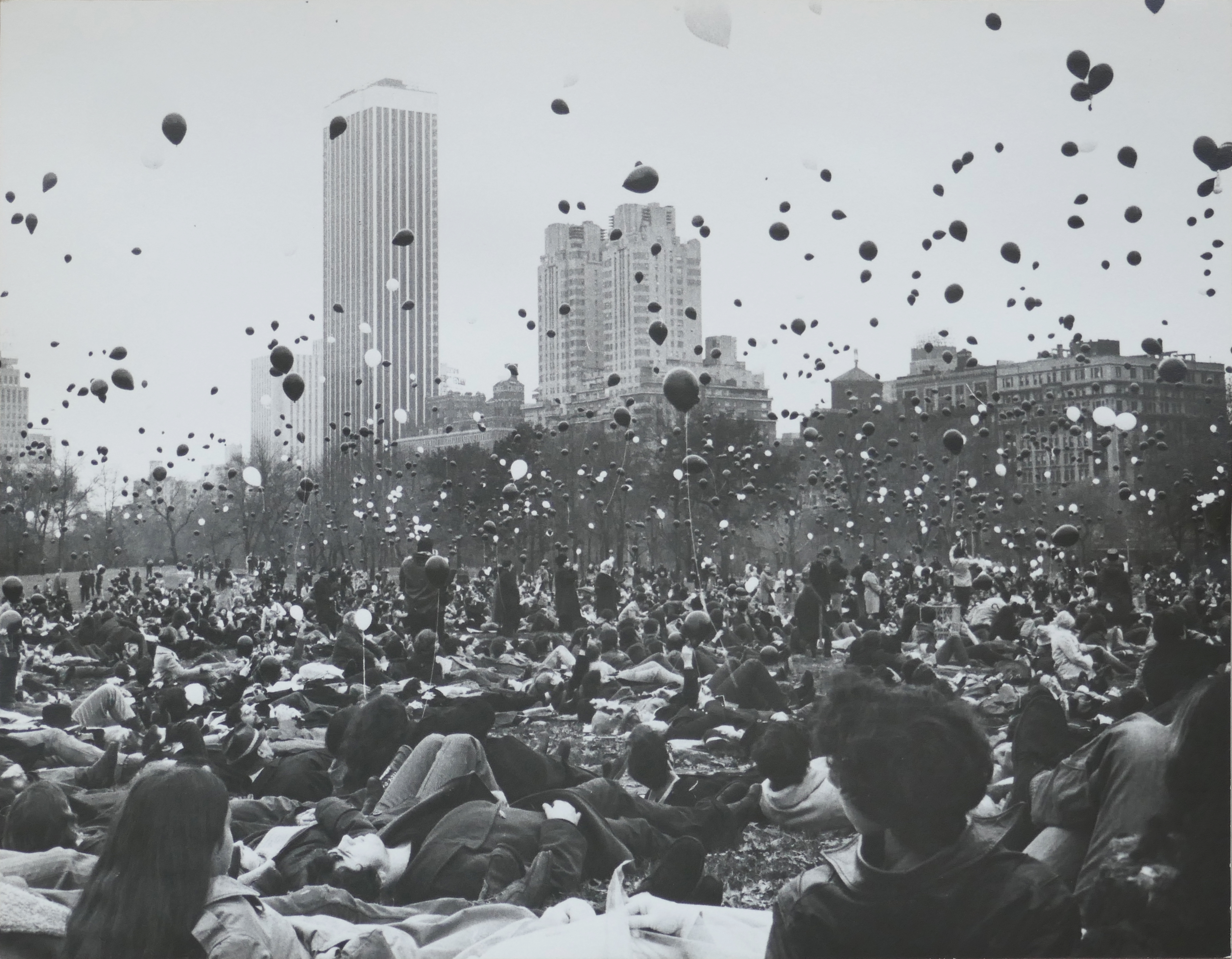
- A 1969 lie-in at Sheep Meadow in Central Park
- Date: 1967–1970
- Location: Central Park, Manhattan, New York
- Methods: Concerts; Demonstrations

In the 1960s, several "be-ins" were held in Central Park, Manhattan, New York City as counterculture demonstrations on various issues, including opposition to U.S. involvement in the Vietnam War.

== Background ==
During the 1960s America was involved in the Vietnam War. This war was a controversial one because many people were against the United States' involvement in South Vietnam. Adding to the tension of the Americans against the war was the emergence of a generation of people who were a part of the counter-culture and believed that they should do anything possible to go against the establishment. The counter-culture generation decided that Central Park would be the perfect host for their demonstrations.

In 1965, citizens of New York experienced their first blow against their freedom of speech as Commissioner, Newbold Morris, refused to give them a permit that they would need in order to use a section of the park for anti-war speeches. Opponents of the ban called it a form of discrimination. In 1967, Parks Commissioner August Heckscher II said that Central Park would no longer be allowed to serve as a venue for mass demonstrations because they were disruptive and caused damages to the park which were costly.

After Hecksher was met with great opposition by protestors who held up unauthorized banners and burned draft cards in the park anyway, he decided to set up designated areas just for these types of demonstrations such as Randall's Island. As a part of the compromise made by the New York Civil Liberties Union, a separate area in Central Park was set aside for big demonstrations.

== History ==
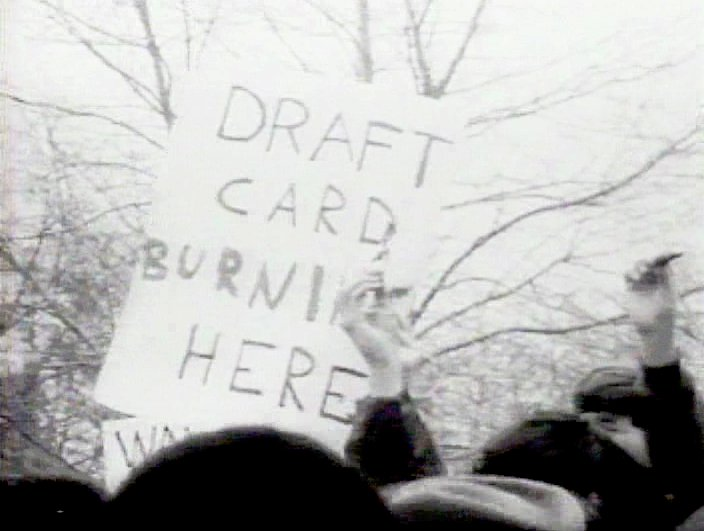
Draft card burning in Sheep Meadow in Central Park, 1967

On New Year's Eve 1967, a thousand people accompanied by music and geese burned down a Christmas tree in Central Park. City parks commissioner Thomas P.F. Hoving hosted the event, stating "We're going to do this again... you know, it's old hat to go to Times Square when we can have such a wonderful happening in Central Park".

=== 1967 ===
The March 26, 1967 Central Park be-in, spreading a message of love and tolerance on Easter Sunday, was organized by actor Jim Fouratt, magazine editor Paul Williams, art administrator Susan Hartnett of Experiments in Art and Technology, and Chilean poet and playwright Claudio Badal. With a budget of $250 they printed 3,000 posters and 40,000 small notices designed by Peter Max and distributed them around the city. The Police and Parks Departments quietly and unofficially cooperated with the organizers. An estimated 10,065 people participated in the event at the Sheep Meadow in Central Park.

The majority of participants were hippies. They were joined by families who had attended the Easter parade and members of the Spanish community who were notified of the event by Spanish language posters. The New York Times described them as "poets from the Bronx, dropouts from the East Village, interior decorators from the East Side, teachers from the West Side and teeny boppers from Long Island" and said that "they wore carnation petals and paper stars and tiny mirrors on foreheads, paint around the mouth and cheeks, flowering bedsheets, buttons and tights".

The event was guarded by small number of police. At 6:45 a.m. the first police car arrived. The car was covered with flowers while the crowd chanted of "daffodil power" at which point the police quickly retreated. While police held their distance most of the day, 5 officers did approach two nude participants, at which point the officers were surrounded while the crowd chanted "We love cops/"Turn on cops".

The situation was defused when the crowd at the urging of other participants backed off. At 7:30 at night the police beamed lights on the group and used bullhorns to tell participants to disperse. Again the police were rushed by participants. Following a brief period of tension the police decided to let the event continue. Black and white film footage from this event appears in the 1972 film Ciao! Manhattan.

Less than a month later, on April 15, another anti-war rally took place as a part of the "Spring Mobilization to End the War in Vietnam". Once again the number of demonstrators grew drastically to an estimated 100–400 thousand attendees. This peace rally, which assembled and started off in Central Park and then marched to the United Nations, was said to be the largest of its kind at its time. The demonstrators ranged from Sioux Indians from South Dakota to members of the African American community all rallying for one cause, peace. There was a peace fair, which featured performances by folk singers and rock groups. People held signs that read "Don't Make Vietnam an American Reservation" "Make Love not War" and No Vietnamese Ever Called Me Nigger.

The protesters made their way from Central Park to the U.N., where speeches were given by several leaders including Benjamin Spock, James Bevel, and Martin Luther King Jr. Dr. King declared that the war in Vietnam was a "conflict against a coloured people" and that "white Americans are not going to deal in the problems of coloured people when they're exterminating a whole nation of coloured people". Although there were five arrests made during this demonstration, they were of counter-demonstrators who staged an Anti-Communist rally. Around 75 protesters burned their draft cards.

Later that spring the counter-culture revolution continued in Central Park but this time "Armed with electric guitars". About 450 people attended the concert. Various bands such as the Grateful Dead performed for the gatherers who originally were scheduled to gather in Tompkins Square Park but was forced to move to Central Park. The New York Times described the attendees as "young people, some with bare feet and others wearing sandals or socks who did some moderately contortionate dancing at first. But then the pace quickly changed and soon they were jumping around like rag dolls being jerked by wires".

=== 1968 ===
During 1968, the Peace Rally and the Easter Be-In were combined into a single event. In April, about 90,000 people ranging from veterans to religious groups to African Americans to Puerto Ricans to women groups to labor groups to students gathered at Sheep Meadow. Amongst the speakers at this particular demonstration was Coretta Scott King who spoke in place of her husband, Martin Luther King Jr., who had been assassinated two weeks earlier. In her speech she said: "The inter-relatedness of domestic and foreign affairs is no longer questioned". The Village Voice described the crowd as apathetic and said there was a feeling that this had all been done before.

=== 1969 ===
During the early 1969 Be-In/Peace Rally, The Village Voice reported that there was said to be between 15,000 and 20,000 people in attendance. This be-in became more radical than the other be-ins that previously took place in Central Park, as bonfires erupted. One person described Sheep Meadow as having "the aura of a bombed out battlefield". Things became worse when a person leapt into one of the bonfires. When he was finally pulled from the bonfires by other demonstrators, word came out that an ambulance would not arrive until Sheep Meadow was cleared. Because the crowd would not disperse, the man had to be carried through the crowd to be transported to the hospital. Three police officers were injured when the demonstrators hit them with rocks.

The Be-In on April 6, 1969, was recorded by Irv Teibel and released on his Environments (album series).

In November 1969, protesters took a different approach and organized a lie-in at Sheep Meadow in Central Park. About three thousand protesters laid out blankets on Sheep meadow and held white and black balloons used to symbolize those killed and those potentially killed in the war in Vietnam. This lie-in was met with opposition from some city officials and some members of the general public. The demonstrators were met with this opposition because of the message that they were trying to get across and because of the usage of the city's public space.

=== 1970 ===
On June 28, 1970, there was a massive Gay Be-In held in Sheep Meadow to commemorate the first anniversary of the Stonewall riots. The Gay march went from Washington Place in Greenwich Village uptown on Sixth Avenue to end with a "gay-in" in Sheep's Meadow.

== See also ==
- Human Be-In
