= Wollman Rink =

Ice rink in New York City's Central Park

Coordinates: 40°46′03″N 73°58′28″W

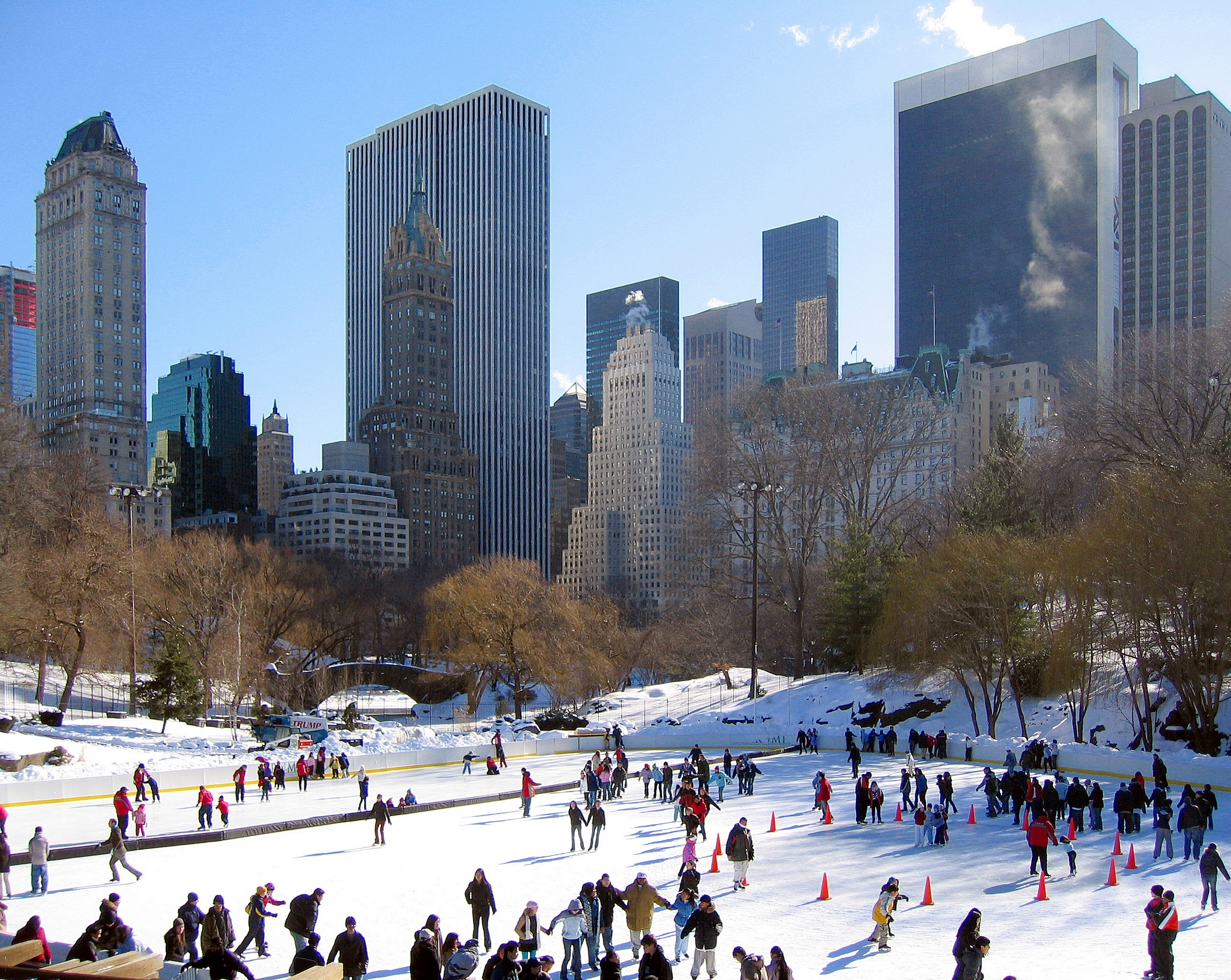
Wollman Rink during the daytime

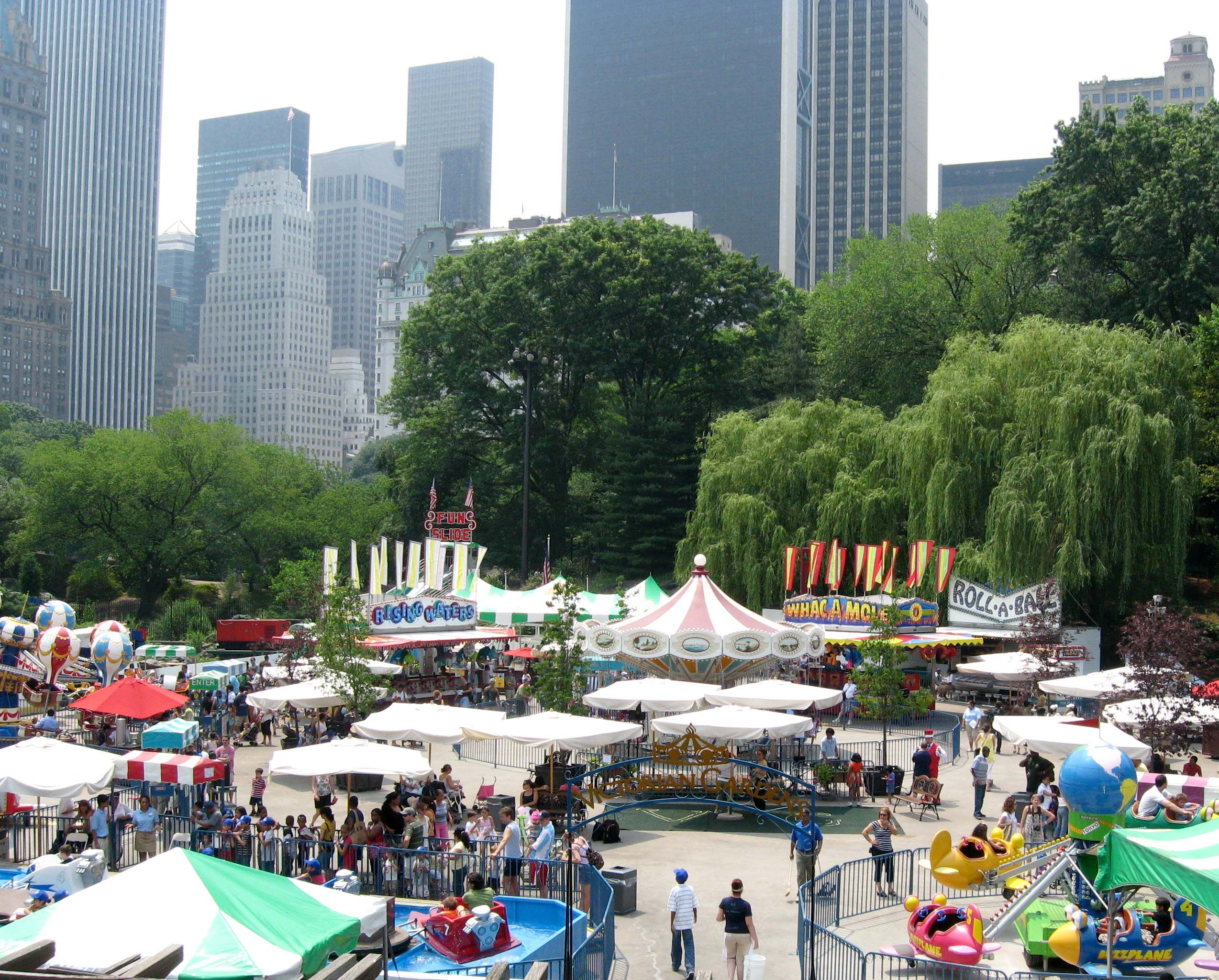
Summertime amusement park

Notable buildings and structures of Central Park. Click on the map and then on the points for details.

Wollman Rink is a public ice rink in the southern part of Central Park, Manhattan, New York City. It is named after the Wollman family who donated the funds for its original construction. The rink is open for ice skating from late October to early April. From 2003 until 2019, Victorian Gardens, a seasonal amusement park for children, was operated on the site from late May to September.

Wollman Rink opened in 1950, having been proposed four years earlier. The rink was closed for renovations in late 1980 and reopened in November 1986. Following the renovation, The Trump Organization operated the rink under contract with the New York City government until 1995 and again from 2001 until 2021, when control was given to Wollman Park Partners, a joint venture formed between Harris Blitzer Sports & Entertainment, The Related Companies, and Equinox Group with a 5-year contract. In 2026, a 20-year contract effective May 1, 2027, was awarded to Wollman Rink Partners II, a partnership between Related Companies and CityPickle.

== Site ==
The rink is located at the southeast corner of Central Park. It was formerly part of the Pond, located directly east of Wollman Rink. The Pond's western section was drained and backfilled during the mid-20th century.

Wollman Rink at Central Park is distinct from the Kate Wollman Memorial Rink at Prospect Park in Brooklyn which was built with money donated by the William J. Wollman Foundation after Kate Wollman's death. It was operational from 1961 until its demolition in 2010.

== History ==
=== Initial planning and funding ===
A skating rink in the southeastern corner of Central Park was first proposed in 1945. In 1949, philanthropist Kate Wollman (1869–1955), great-aunt of the founders of H&R Block, donated $600,000 for the rink's construction to commemorate her family. One of her brothers was William J. Wollman, who operated the W.J. Wollman & Co. stock exchange firm, originally in Kansas City and later in New York. After he died in 1937, she helped administer his estate.

Wollman Rink opened on December 21, 1950. A nearby playground opened at that time. Within five years, the rink had recorded more than 1.1 million skaters.

=== Renovation: 1980–1986 ===
In 1974, the New York City Parks and Recreation Department started planning a renovation of the rink, including switching the refrigeration system from brine to liquid Freon to lower the operation costs at a time of rising fuel costs. In January 1975, a $4 million plan to renovate Wollman Rink at the park's southeastern corner was announced. By late 1975, the Central Park Task Force, an agency of NYC Parks, released a revised plan to dredge the Pond and redesign the landscaping in the park's southeastern corner for $2.5 million. All plans were deferred due to the 1975 New York City fiscal crisis.

The rink had to be closed in the winter of 1980 when its concrete floor buckled; at that time, the renovation was estimated to cost up to $4.9 million and take two years. Due to the necessity of soliciting bids for three separate contracts and a series of planning errors, construction mishaps, and flooding caused by heavy rains, the renovations had not been completed by May 1986 when the city reversed the decision to use Freon and decided on staying with brine in plastic pipes. By that time, $12.9 million had been spent, with an additional $2 to $3 million estimated to complete the work by the winter of 1987.

Donald Trump then publicly offered to complete the renovations at his expense within six months, in return for leases to operate the rink and an adjacent restaurant in order to recoup his costs. Instead, Mayor Ed Koch agreed to reimburse Trump for any costs up to an agreed limit, and Trump agreed to donate the profits of rink and restaurant to charity and public works. Trump convinced the primary contractor, HRH Construction, to do the work without making a profit, telling them that their work would pay for itself with the publicity. However, in press conferences that Trump held at every incremental milestone in the four-month effort, he never mentioned HRH.

Adrian Benepe, then the Parks Department's spokesperson and later its commissioner, stated the project was largely complete by the time Trump entered the picture, and that the city, not Trump, had paid the contractors for the actual reconstruction. The work was completed two months ahead of schedule and $750,000 under the estimated costs. As part of the agreement to keep operating Wollman Rink, Trump agreed to also take a concession for the Lasker Rink, and the Trump Organization won concessions for the rinks in 1987.

=== Skating rink operation: 1986–2021 ===
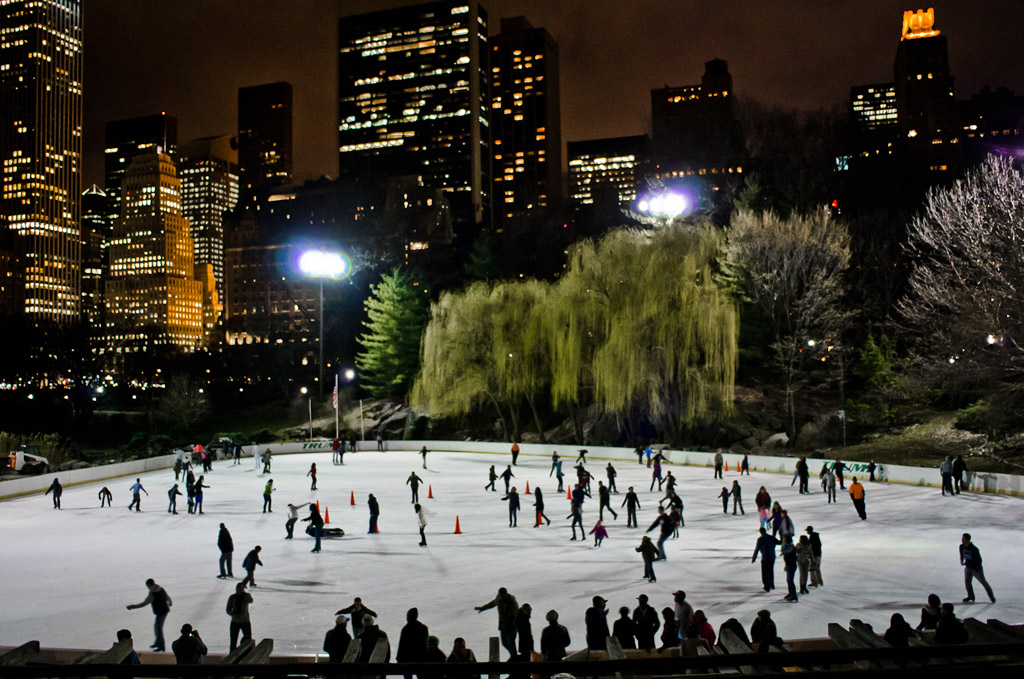
Wollman Rink in 2011

When the rink reopened in November 1986, ticket prices were raised from $2.50 to $4.50, and attendance was up from 130,000 in 1980 to 250,000 in 1987. As part of its agreement with the city, the Trump Organization donated most of the profit to public works, including $50,000 for the rink's electricity costs, and to charity, among them United Cerebral Palsy, Partnership for the Homeless, and Gay Men's Health Crisis.

The Trump Organization held the concession until 1995, when M&T Pretzel Inc. outbid Trump for a six-year contract to operate Wollman and Lasker skating rinks. A Trump-owned subsidiary, Wollman Rink Operations LLC, won another concession in 2001 to operate the rinks until April 30, 2021. Wollman Rink Operations LLC is owned by DJT Holdings LLC, which was owned by the Donald J. Trump Revocable Trust during Trump's first presidency.

A 2007 city comptroller review found that Trump's operation had underreported its revenue from the rink by $106,608, thus shortchanging the city.

In 2019, the Trump Organization removed the Trump name from most signs and logos at both Wollman and Lasker Rinks without giving a reason. During its last season of operation, the Trump Organization charged admission fees of $12 for adults from Monday to Thursday, $19 on Friday to Sunday and holidays, and $6 all week for youths 11 and under.

==== Cancellation of Trump Organization contracts ====
In January 2021, New York City mayor Bill de Blasio announced that the city government would be severing all contracts with the Trump Organization, citing Trump's involvement in the previous week's storming of the United States Capitol. The cancellation of the Trump Organization's contracts to operate Wollman Rink, Lasker Rink, and the Central Park Carousel was supposed to go into effect on February 26. The city later allowed the rinks to stay open until the scheduled end of the skating season. The Trump concession expired in April 2021.

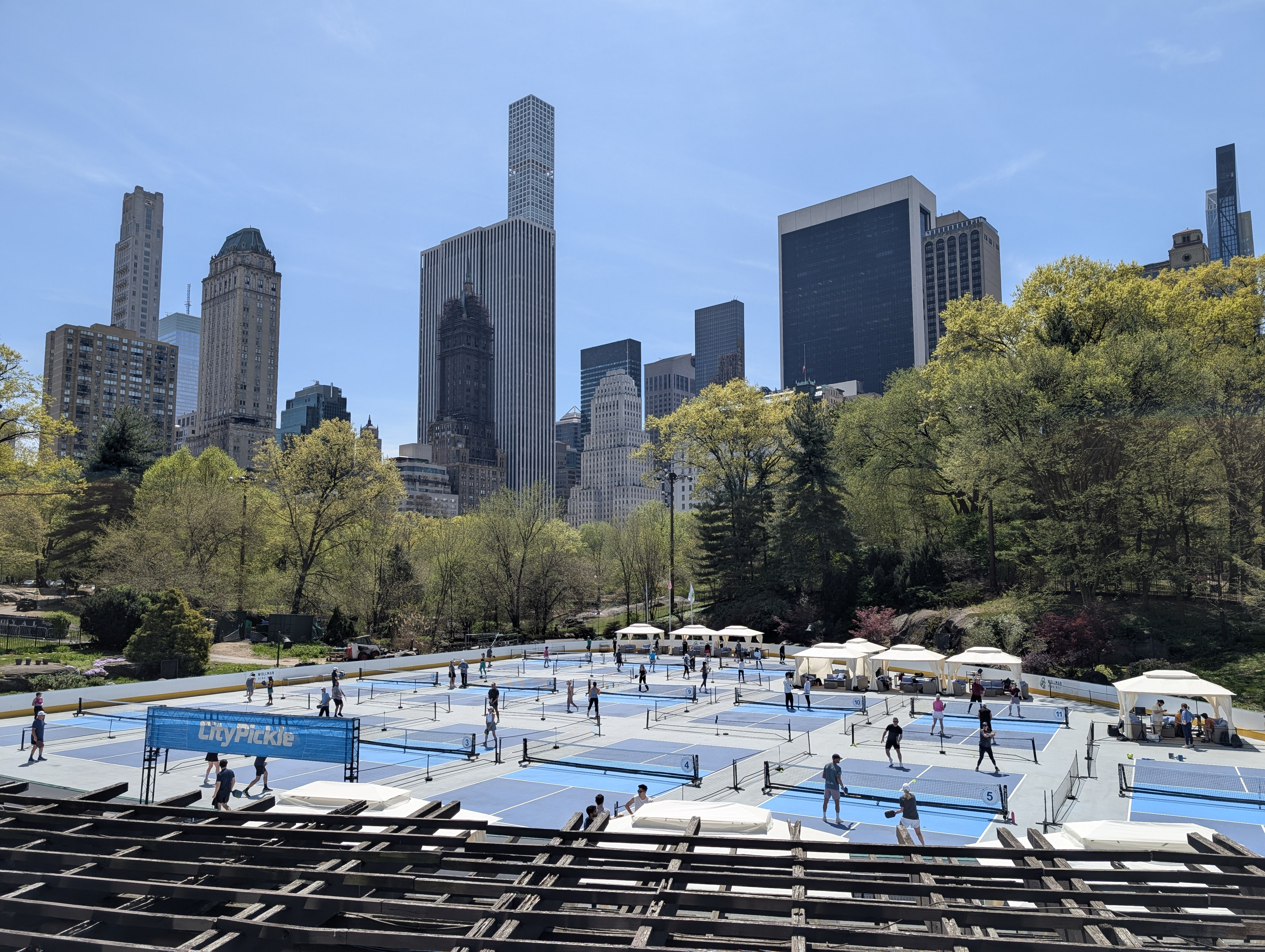
Pickleball courts in April 2025

=== Rink operation 2021–present ===
In February 2021, the Parks Department announced their request for competitive bids on 5-year contracts for the operation and maintenance of Wollman Rink to be submitted by March 2021. Separately, the non-profit Central Park Conservancy had proposed operating the rink for 20 years and investing $50 million towards renovations. In July 2021, Wollman Park Partners LLC, a joint venture between Harris Blitzer Sports & Entertainment, The Related Companies, and Equinox Group, received a five-year contract to operate the rink. The rink, with a new clubhouse, reopened in November 2021.

Temporary pickleball courts were installed at Wollman Rink between April and October 2023, as part of a short-term agreement with CityPickle, which operated the courts. The courts attracted 56,000 players during 2023. NYC Parks subsequently announced in April 2024 that it would install 14 permanent courts at the rink, under the ice. In late 2024, NYC Parks began seeking an operator for the rink; the Trump Organization, the Central Park Conservancy, and Wollman Park Partners II (a partnership between Related Companies and CityPickle) submitted bids. The city awarded a 20-year contract, effective May 1, 2027, to Wollman Park Partners II in October 2025.

== Other uses ==
=== Concert venue ===
Until 1980, the rink was the venue for annual summer rock, pop, country, and jazz concerts. Initially the "Wollman Theater" or "Wollman Skating Rink Theater" had 4,400 seats; bleachers were added in 1972 to increase the capacity to 8,000. In 1957, WOR radio personality Jean Shepherd hosted a series of "Jazz under the stars" concerts on 15 consecutive nights, featuring Billie Holiday, Bud Powell, Lionel Hampton, Dave Brubeck, Dizzy Gillespie, Buddy Rich, Dinah Washington, Stan Getz, and others. From 1966 to 1980, music festivals consisting of 30 to 50 concerts each were held at the rink. The festivals were named after their main sponsors, Rheingold Beer in 1966 and 1967, F. & M. Schaefer Brewing Company from 1968 to 1976 when the festival was called the Schaefer Music Festival, and Dr Pepper from 1977 to 1980 when it was called the Dr Pepper Central Park Music Festival. Todd Rundgren's Utopia, The Jimi Hendrix Experience, The Who, Mothers of Invention, Led Zeppelin, The Beach Boys, and the Patti Smith Group were some of the biggest rock groups who played at the rink; country, blues, rhythm & blues, and jazz artists included Earl Scruggs, John Lee Hooker, The Supremes, and Buddy Rich.

=== Victorian Gardens ===
From 2003 until 2019, Central Amusement International, LLC, operator of the Luna Park amusement park in Coney Island, Brooklyn, operated Victorian Gardens, a seasonal amusement park for children "specifically geared to ages 2–12 years old", on the site from late May to September.

=== Pickleball ===
Wollman Rink opened 14 pickleball courts in 2023, branded as CityPickle. In 2024, the rink's floor was resurfaced with a permanent surface to replace the acrylic "carpet" that covered the rink's concrete surface each spring.

=== Beach volleyball ===
In July 2025, the AVP beach volleyball Professionals League held week six of their 2025 season at the rink. 300 tons of sand was trucked in to create the playing surface. The event was broadcast by the CW and CBS.

== In popular culture ==
Wollman Rink has been featured in several films, including Love Story (1970), Carnal Knowledge (1971), The Devil's Own (1997), Serendipity (2001), Night at the Museum (2006), Limitless (2011), Mr. Popper's Penguins (2011), and Home Alone 2: Lost in New York (1992), as well as a 2015 episode of the television show Impractical Jokers.
