= Central Park Carousel =

Carousel in Manhattan, New York

Coordinates: 40°46′12″N 73°58′31″W

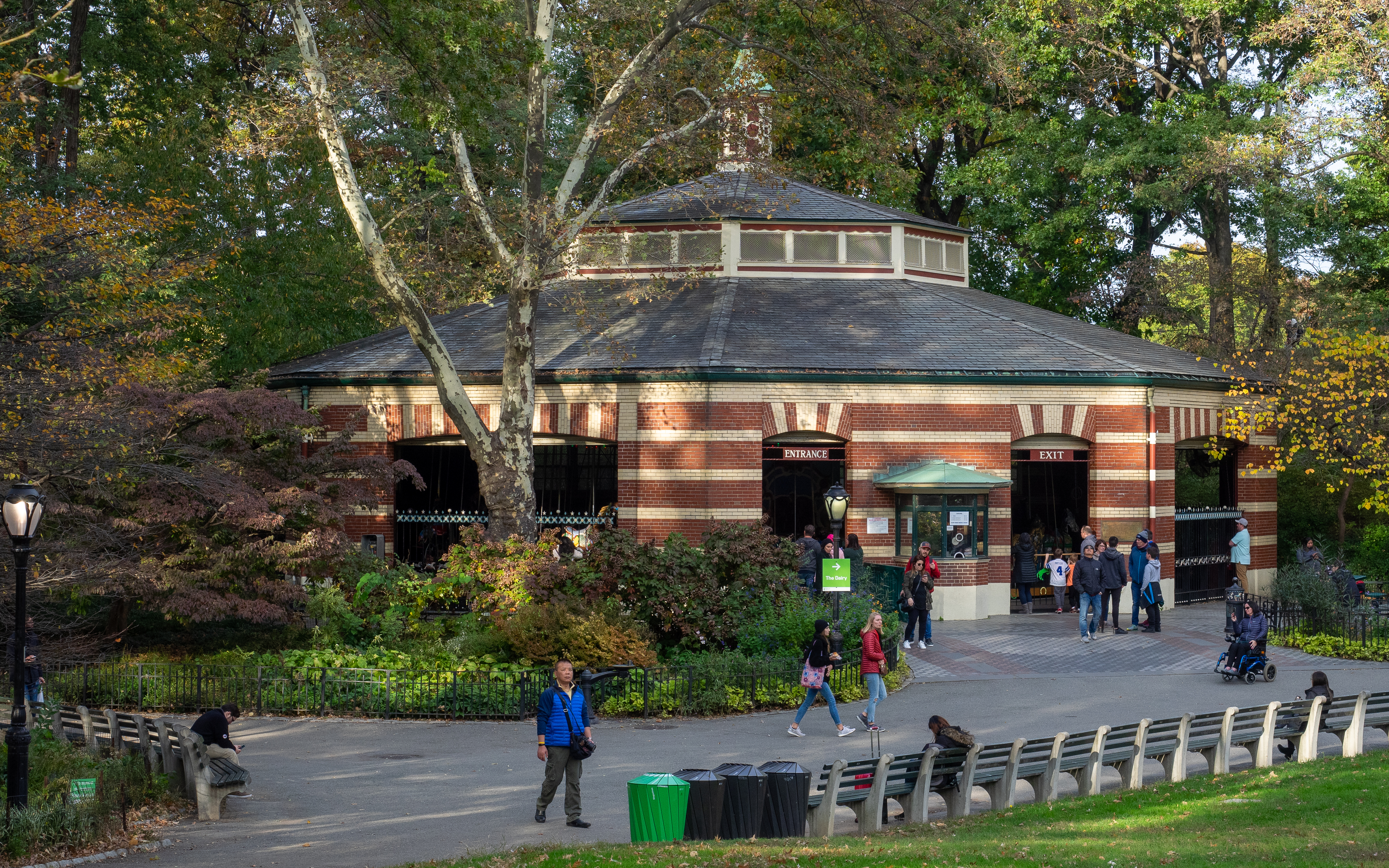
Central Park Carousel in the Fall of 2019

Notable buildings and structures of Central Park. Click on the map and then on the points for details.

The Central Park Carousel, officially the Michael Friedsam Memorial Carousel, is a vintage wood-carved carousel located in Central Park in Manhattan, New York City, at the southern end of the park, near East 65th Street. It is the fourth carousel on the site where it is located.

== History ==
The original 1871 carousel was powered by a mule or horse under its platform, signaled to start and stop by the operator tapping his foot. The two succeeding versions were destroyed by fires in 1924 and 1950.

The current carousel is the fourth on the site, and is part of the New York City Landmarks Preservation Commission's "scenic landmark" designation for Central Park. The carousel was made by Solomon Stein and Harry Goldstein in 1908. It was originally installed in a trolley terminal in Coney Island, Brooklyn, where it operated until the 1940s. It was relocated to Central Park in 1951 with a new structure surrounding it. The carousel was renovated in 1982 by the Central Park Conservancy from a donation from Alan and Katherine Stroock, with the surrounding landscape restored in 1991.

In 2010, the city evicted the previous tenant who managed the Carousel. The Trump Organization, a prominent New York City conglomerate owned by Donald Trump that also operated the nearby Wollman Rink, was selected as the new tenant. In return for a lease until 2020, Trump promised to invest $400,000 in renovations over ten years and pay a yearly lease that started at $250,000 and scaled up to $325,000. In statements released as part of the Donald Trump 2016 presidential campaign, the Carousel grossed $1.72 million between 2013 and the end of 2015. The contract to operate the carousel was later extended through 2021. On January 13, 2021, New York City mayor Bill de Blasio announced that the city government would be severing all contracts with the Trump Organization, saying Trump had been involved in the previous week's storming of the United States Capitol. The cancellation of the Trump Organization's contracts to operate Wollman Rink, Lasker Rink, and the Central Park Carousel went in effect in February. Central Amusement International, operator of Victorian Gardens and Luna Park, received a five-year franchise to operate the carousel in July 2021 and began operations there on October 16 that year.

== Description ==
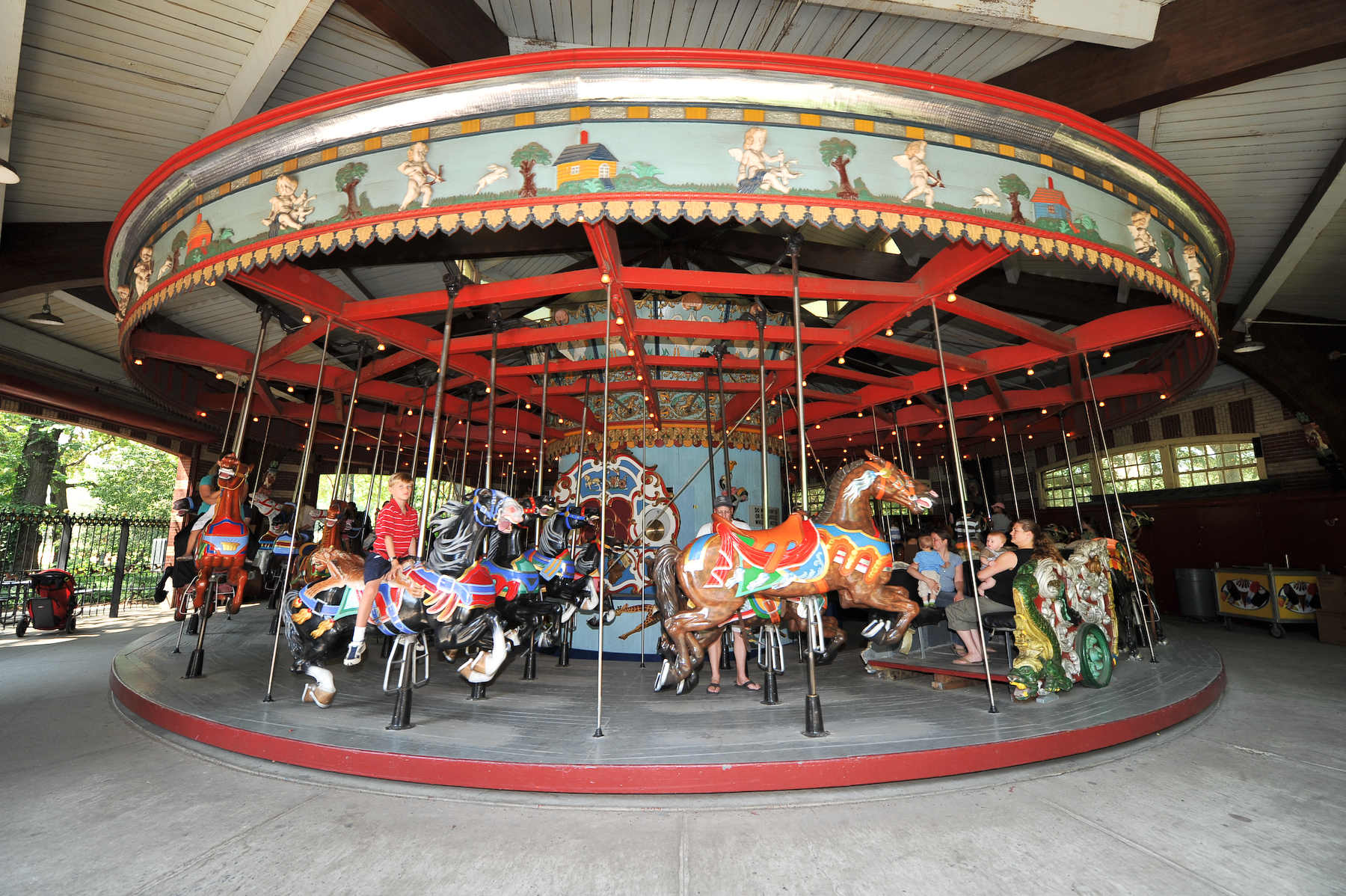
The interior of the Carousel in August 2008, showing the Ruth & Sohn Model 33 band organ.

The current carousel is one of the largest merry-go-rounds in the United States. It has 57 hand-carved horses — 52 jumpers and 5 standers — and two chariots. The carousel is open seven days a week when weather permits and serves around 250,000 riders every year. The carousel has a 52-keyless A. Ruth & Sohn Model 33 Band Organ playing waltzes, marches, and polkas. The organ was originally converted to play Wurlitzer 150 rolls, up until August 2013 when a MIDI-controlled interface replaced the roll system, though it still played in the same arrangement scale.

== In popular culture ==
The carousel that burned down in 1950 was notably mentioned in J. D. Salinger's novel The Catcher in the Rye. It had the traditional feature of a brass ring for the rider to grab, used by Salinger in the story. The ring feature was not replaced when the current carousel was built. This one is featured in the Marvel TV series The Punisher (though filming took place at the Forest Park Carousel in Queens).
