= Rat Rock (Central Park) =

Rock formation in Manhattan, New York

- Umpire Rock
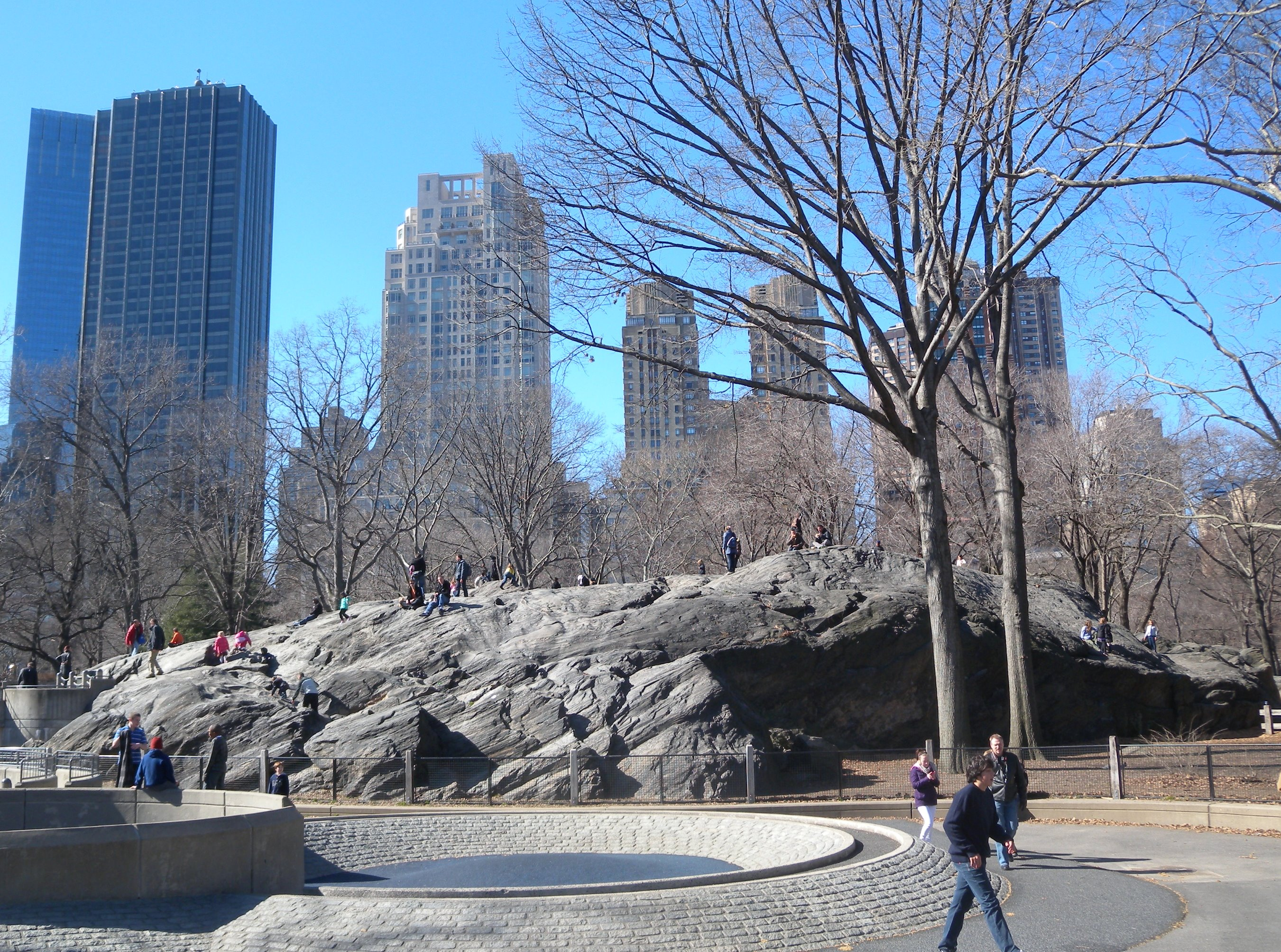
- East side of the rock

- Location within Manhattan Location within New York City Location within New York Location within the United States
- Location: Central Park, Manhattan, New York City, New York, U.S.
- Coordinates: 40.769361°N 73.977655°W
- Type of climbing: Bouldering
- Height range: 25 feet (7.6 m)
- Rock type: Schist
- Ownership: Department of Parks and Recreation
- Access: Public

Rat Rock, also known as Umpire Rock, is an outcrop of Manhattan schist which protrudes from the bedrock in Central Park, Manhattan, New York City.

== Description ==
The outcrop is located near the southwest corner of Central Park, south of the Heckscher Ballfields near the alignments of 62nd Street and Seventh Avenue. It is officially named Umpire Rock, due to its proximity to the ballfields, but is commonly known as Rat Rock after the rats that used to swarm there at night.

It measures about 150 feet (46 m) wide and is 25 feet (7.6 m) tall at its highest point. The outcrop has different east, west, and north faces, each of which presents a differing climbing challenge. The rock has striations caused by glaciation.

== Climbing usage ==
Boulderers congregate at the outcrop, sometimes as many as 50 per day. A 2007 article in The New York Times highlighted regular climber Yukihiko Ikumori, a then 60-year-old gardener from the West Village known as the "spiritual godfather" of the rock. Other climbers include tourists and visitors to the city who learn about the climbing spot from the Internet and word of mouth. Experienced climbers such as Ikumori often show neophytes good routes and techniques.

While the outcrop has been included in a list of the "top 5 urban bouldering crags", more experienced outsiders may be disappointed as the quality of the stone is poor, the setting is gloomy, and the climbs present so little challenge that it has been called "one of America's most pathetic boulders".

The park police formerly ticketed climbers who climbed more than a few feet up the rock. The City Climbers Club approached the park authorities and, by working to provide safety features such as wood chips around the base, they were able to legalize climbing there.
