= 110th Street (Manhattan) =

West-east street in Manhattan, New York

Coordinates: 40.799261°N 73.954602°W

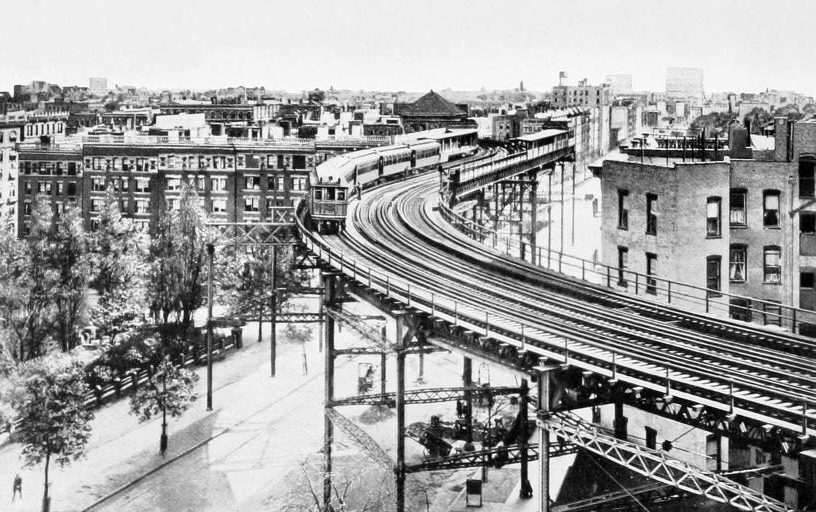
The elevated railroad, pictured in 1915, reached its highest elevation in New York City at the 110th Street curve.

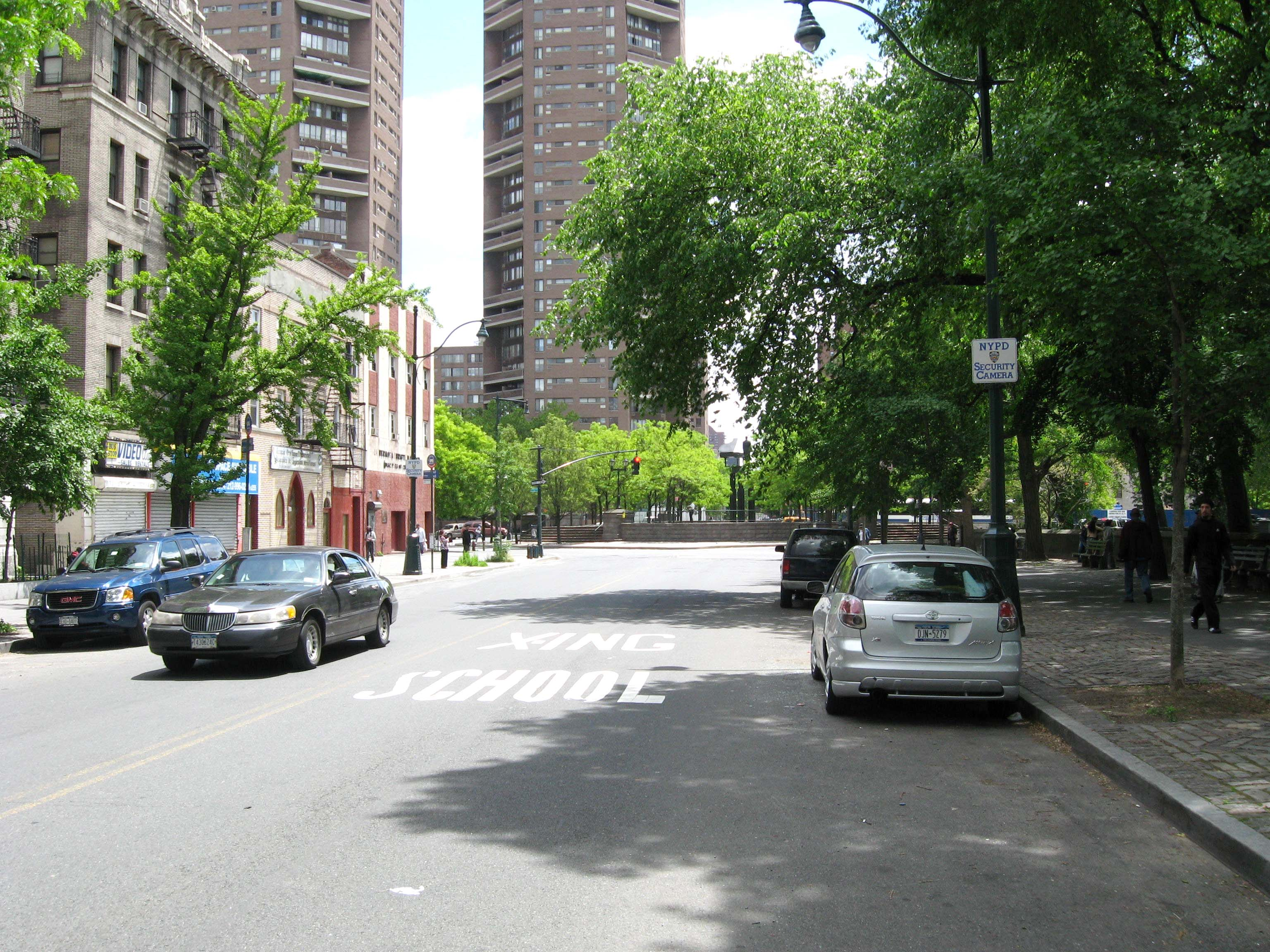
Central Park North and Fifth Avenue

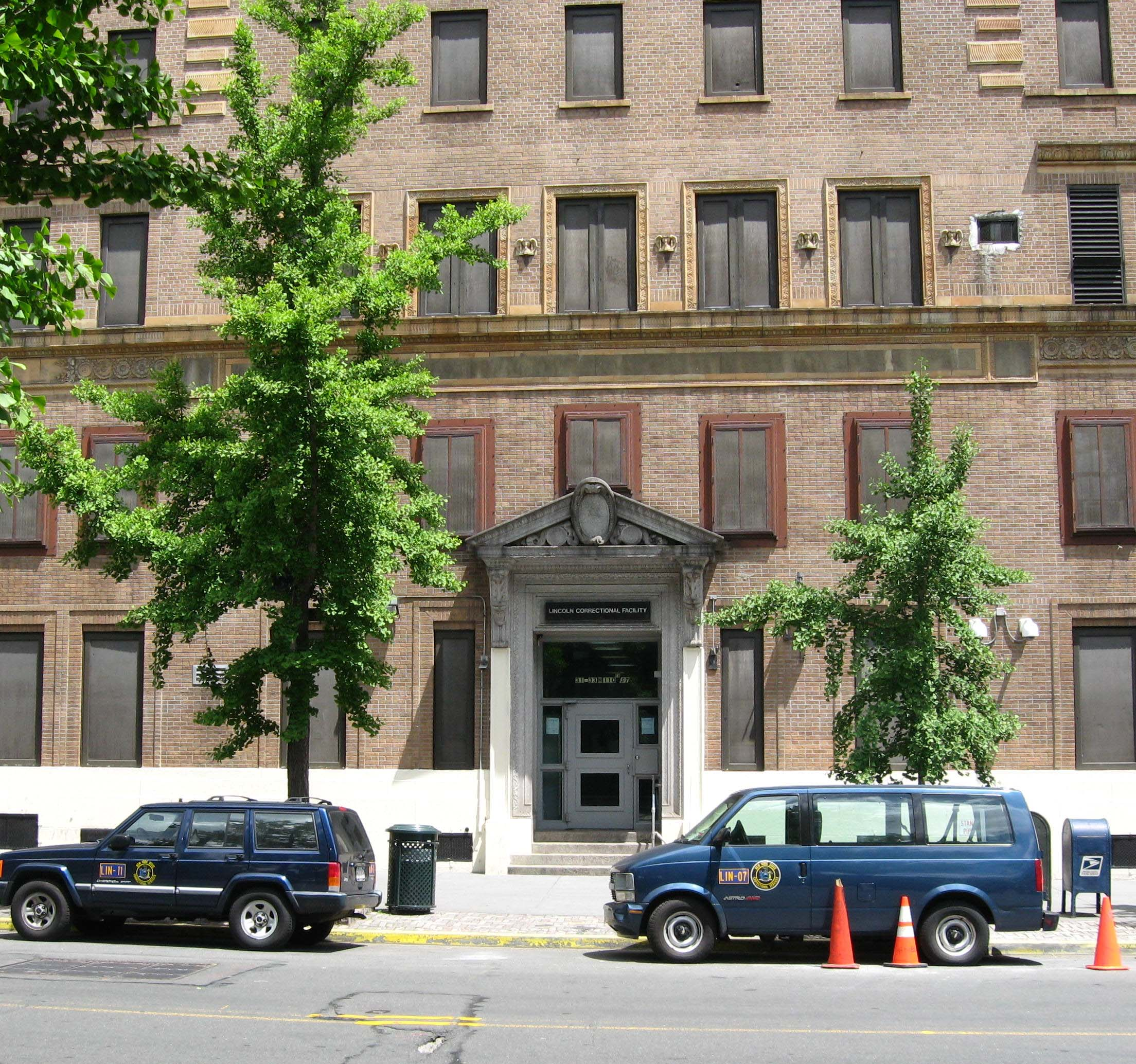
Lincoln Correctional Facility

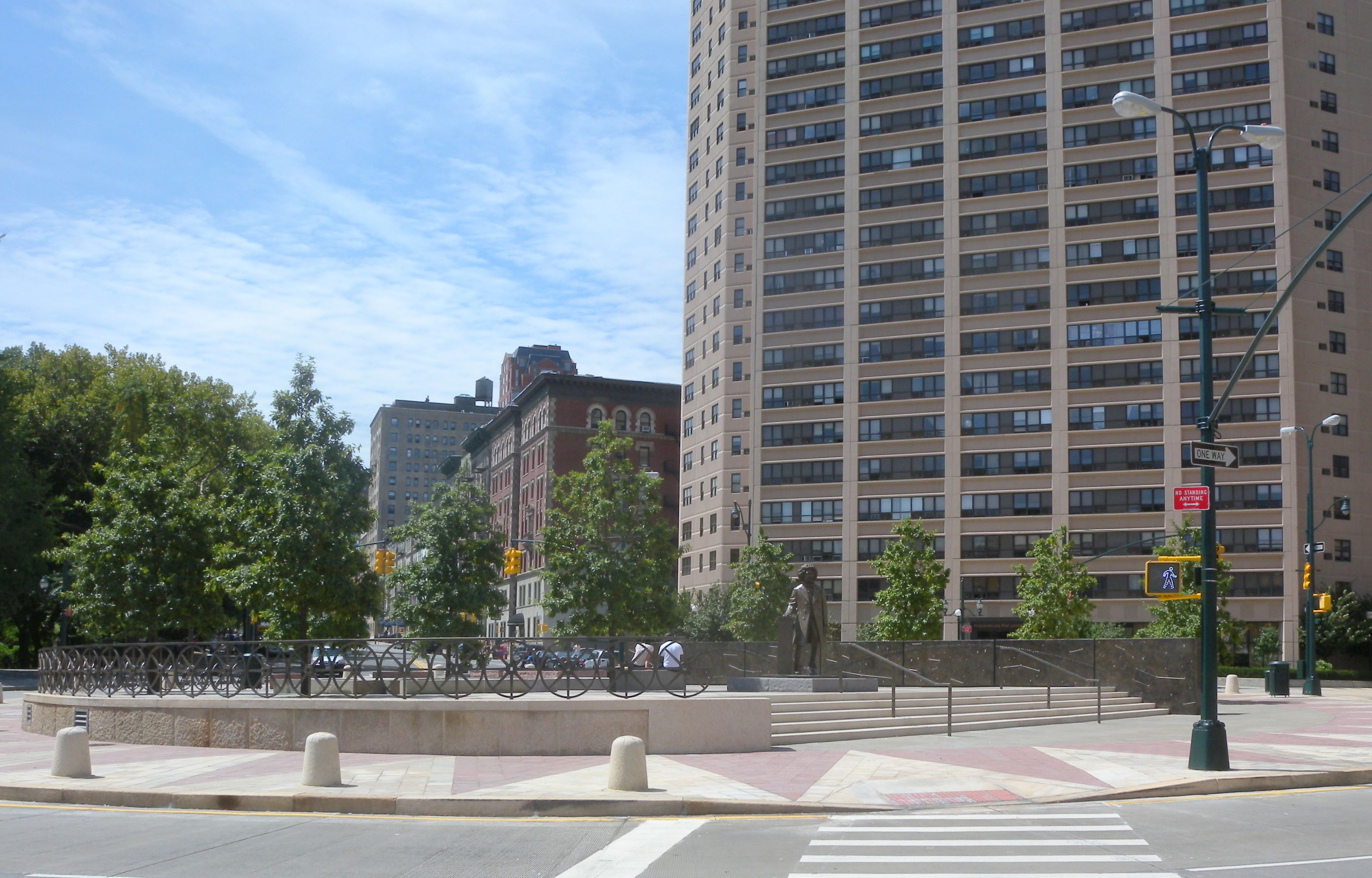
Frederick Douglass Circle

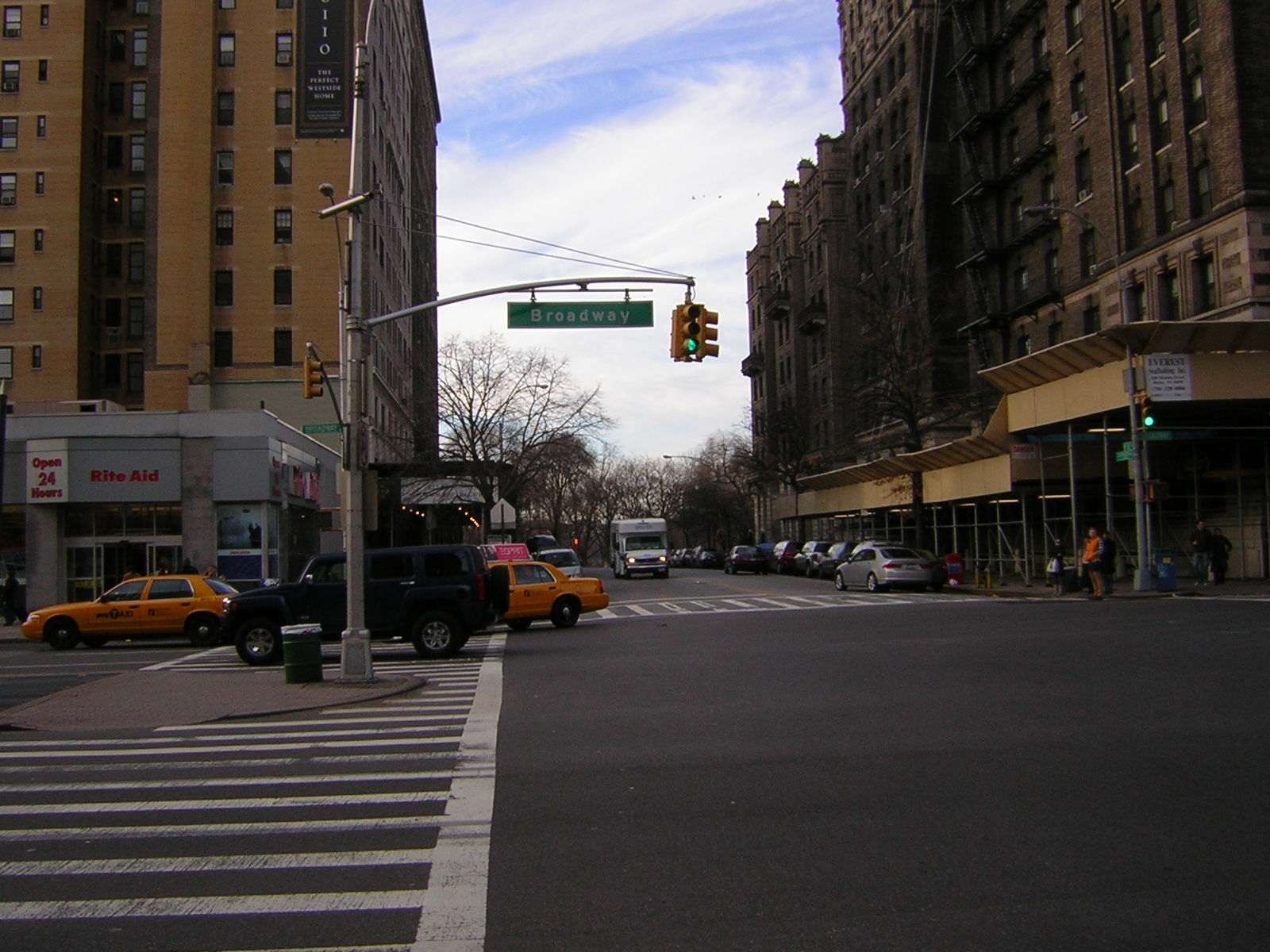
110th Street seen from Broadway in the west toward Riverside Park

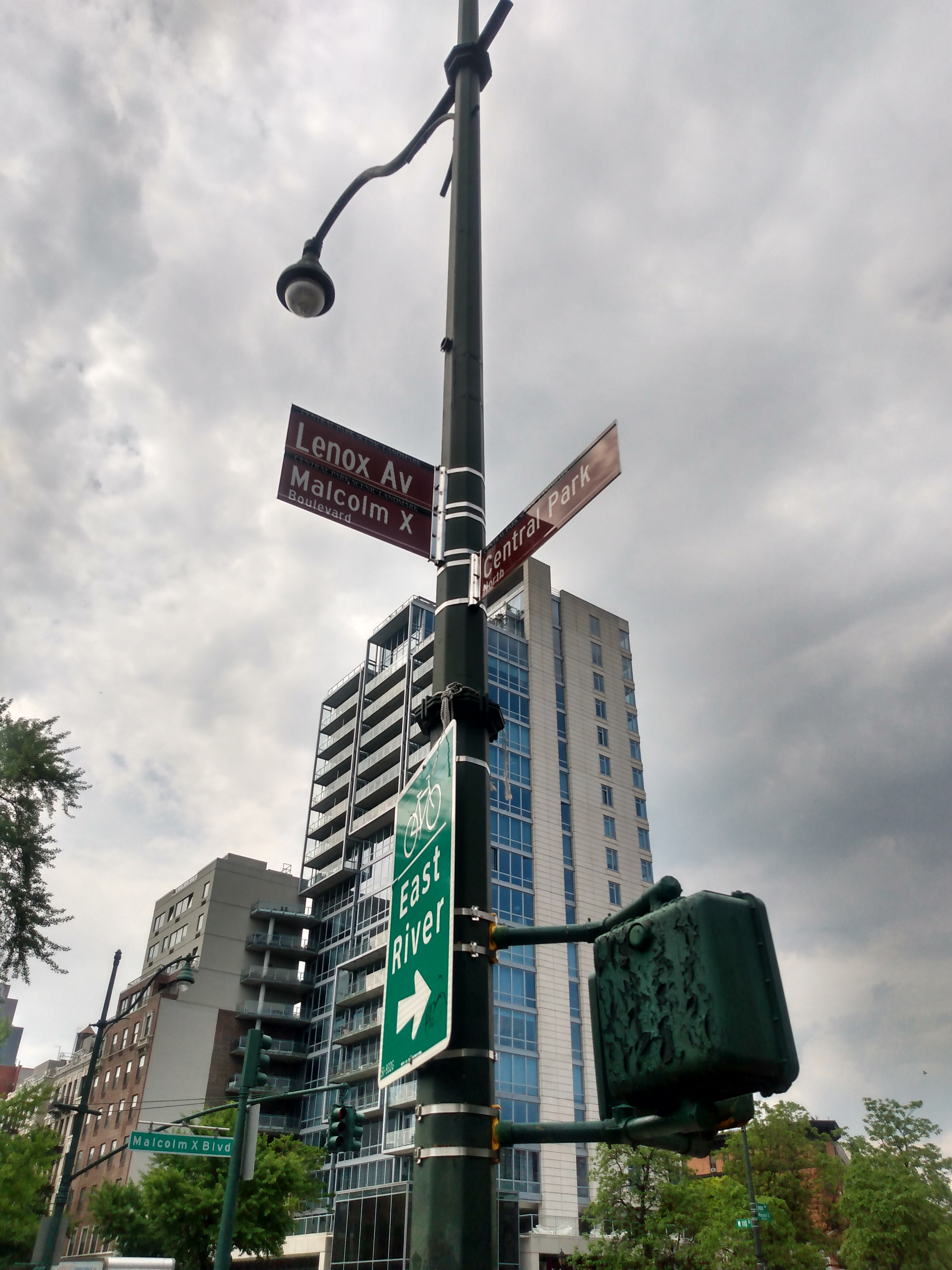
Central Park North sign at Lenox Avenue/Malcolm X Boulevard on the south side of the street

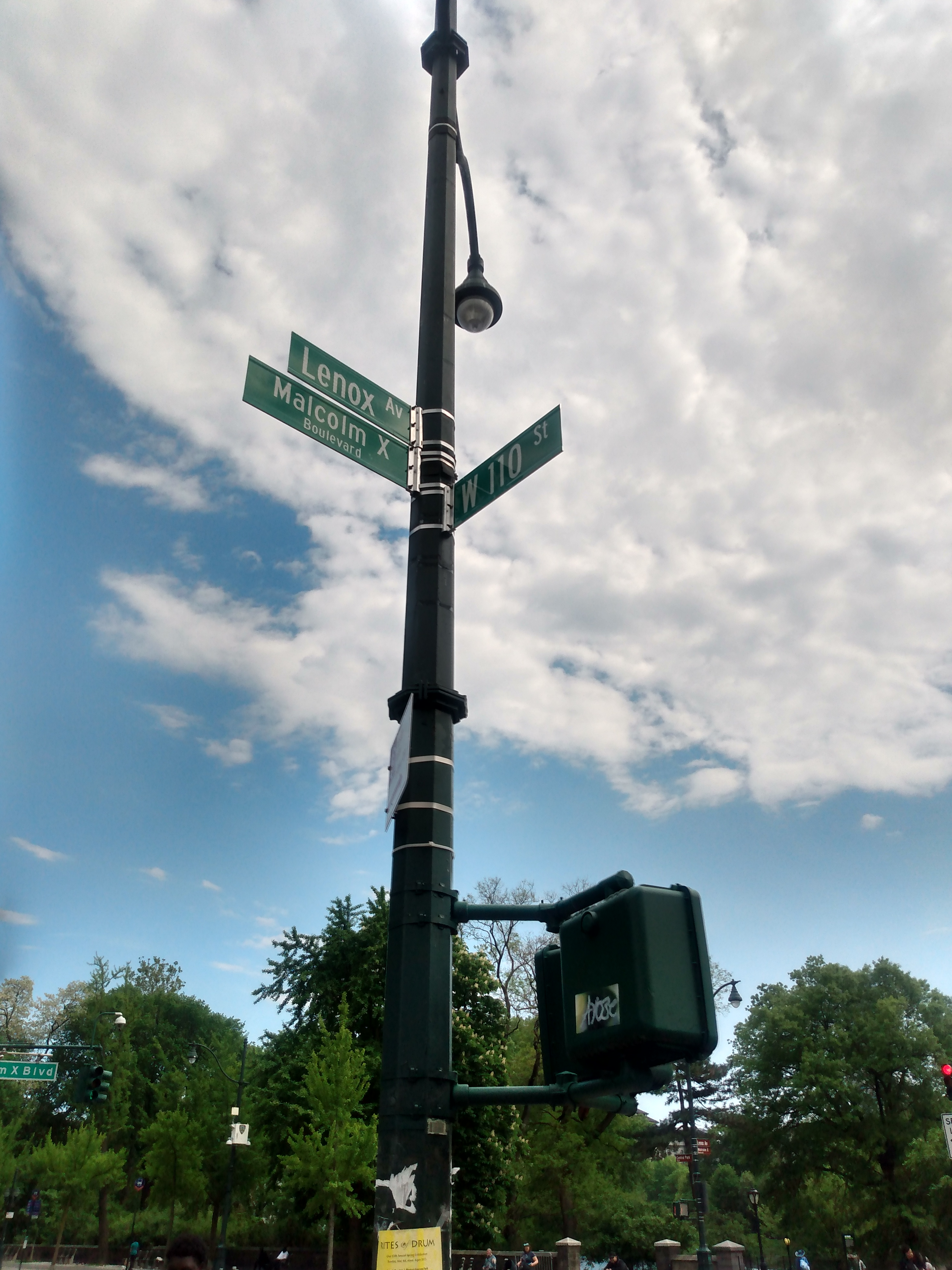
West 110th Street sign at Lenox Avenue/Malcolm X Boulevard on the north side of the street

110th Street is a street in the New York City borough of Manhattan. It is known as Central Park North between Fifth Avenue and Central Park West/Frederick Douglass Boulevard, where it runs along the northern edge of Central Park. From Central Park West to Riverside Drive, it is also known as Cathedral Parkway.

== Route ==
110th Street is an eastbound street between First Avenue and Madison Avenue. The small portion between Madison Avenue and Fifth Avenue is westbound. West of Fifth Avenue, the road widens to accommodate two-way traffic.

The Duke Ellington Memorial, a statue of Duke Ellington, stands in Duke Ellington Circle, a shallow amphitheater at 110th Street and Fifth Avenue, at the northeast corner of Central Park. Unveiled in 1997, the statue, by sculptor Robert Graham, is 25 feet (7.6 m) tall, and depicts the Muses—nine nude caryatids—supporting a grand piano and Duke Ellington on their heads. Duke Ellington Circle is also the site of the future Museum for African Art.

110th Street crosses Central Park West and Frederick Douglass Boulevard at the northwest corner of Central Park, Frederick Douglass Circle. West of there it is also called Cathedral Parkway after the Cathedral of St. John the Divine.

The Parkway forms the south edge of Morningside Park between Manhattan Avenue and Morningside Drive. It forms the south edge of the Cathedral Close of St. John the Divine between Morningside Drive and Amsterdam Avenue, and ends at Riverside Drive before Riverside Park.

=== Central Park North ===
Central Park North is a section of West 110th Street. As the name implies, it lies at the northern end of Central Park. It is bounded by Central Park West on the west and Fifth Avenue on the east. It is notable for its incongruities; the Lincoln Correctional Facility—originally constructed in 1914 for the Young Women's Hebrew Association—stands a few blocks away from new luxury condo developments.

The Central Park North section has three of the original gates of Central Park. Farmers Gate is located at the southern end of Lenox Avenue/Malcolm X Boulevard, while Warriors Gate is located at the southern end of Seventh Avenue/Adam Clayton Powell Jr Boulevard. Pioneers Gate is at Fifth Avenue (Duke Ellington Circle).

The original Polo Grounds was located along West 110th Street / Central Park North, between Fifth and Sixth avenues. Originally hosting polo, it was the home for the New York Metropolitans baseball club from 1880 to 1886 and for the New York Gothams—subsequently the Giants—from 1883 to 1888.

In the first decade of the 21st century, there was significant real estate development on properties with a view of Central Park. In 2003, Manhattan-based developer Athena headed by Louis Dubin bought a property on this street. The building was pitched as "an opportunity for New Yorkers to be on the park at roughly half the price of Central Park South." The rebirth of Harlem along Central Park north had attracted celebrities such as Marcia Gay Harden, Maya Angelou, and Kareem Abdul-Jabbar. The finished building was 20 stories tall with 48 residential units, 9,500 of ground floor retail space, 48 parking spaces, and each unit had a view of Central Park.

== Notable places ==
- Congregation Ramath Orah
- The Africa Center
- Duke Ellington Circle
- Frederick Douglass Circle
- Avalon Morningside Park
- Cathedral of St. John the Divine

== Transportation ==
The elevated IRT Ninth Avenue Line used to reach a great height at its 110th Street station, before its demolition in 1940; it was infamous as a suicide location. Today, there are four New York City Subway stations on 110th Street:

- Cathedral Parkway–110th Street at Broadway serving the 1 train
- Cathedral Parkway–110th Street at Central Park West serving the A, B, and C trains
- 110th Street–Malcolm X Plaza at Lenox Avenue serving the 2 and 3 trains
- 110th Street at Lexington Avenue serving the 4, 6, and <6> trains

110th Street is served by the following New York City Bus routes, all heading west from Madison Avenue or east until Fifth Avenue:

- The M2 heads north on Adam Clayton Powell Jr. Boulevard.
- The M3 heads north on Manhattan Avenue.
- The M4 heads north on Broadway. It is the primary server of 110th Street.

Additional service is provided by the downtown M11, running east from Amsterdam to Columbus Avenues.

The New York Central Railroad's 110th Street station previously existed on Park Avenue, which now carries the Park Avenue main line of the Metro-North Railroad. The station opened in 1876 and closed in 1906.

West 110th Street is the southern boundary of the area where boro cabs may be hailed by passengers.

== Notable people ==
George Gershwin lived in 501 West 110th Street, on the northwest corner of 110th and Amsterdam, where he composed his seminal piece Rhapsody in Blue. He and his brother Ira lived there from 1924 to 1929. Arthur Miller lived in 45 West 110th Street as a child.

== In popular culture ==
- The street is known from the Bobby Womack song "Across 110th Street", which describes prostitution and drug dealing in the area, and from the 1972 movie of the same title (starring Yaphet Kotto and Anthony Quinn).
- The Thad Jones/Mel Lewis Big Band released a highly regarded jazz album in 1969 entitled Central Park North.
- It was the billed hometown of professional wrestling tag team Harlem Heat.
