= Tourism in New York City =

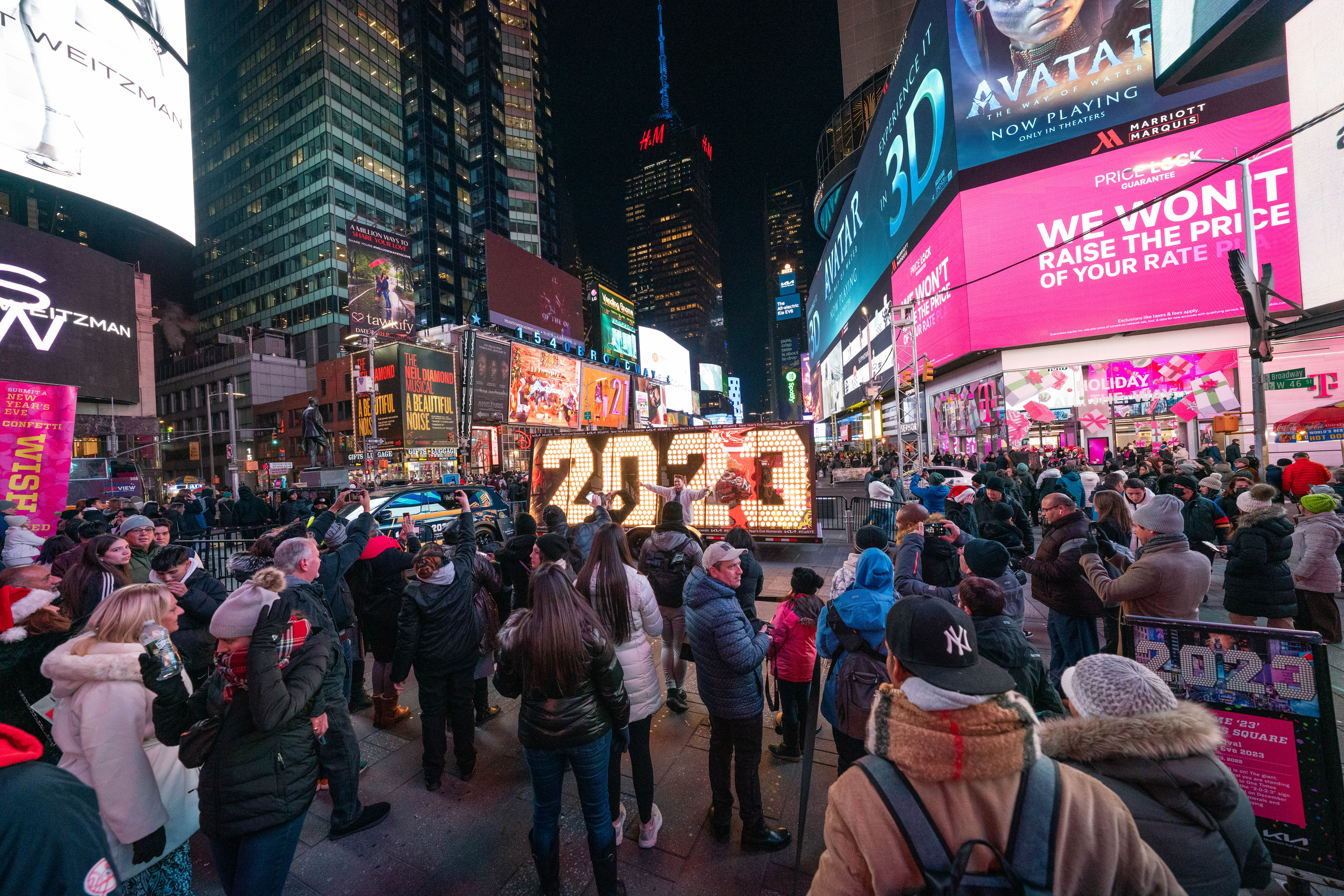
Times Square is the hub of the Broadway theater district and a major cultural venue in Midtown Manhattan. The pedestrian intersection also has one of the highest annual attendance rates of any tourist attraction in the world, estimated at 60 million including daytrippers.

New York City received a ninth consecutive annual record of approximately 65.2 million tourists in 2018, the busiest tourist city attraction, and one of the world's overall busiest tourist attractions, counting not just overnight visitors but anyone visiting for the day from over 50 miles away, including commuters. Overall the city welcomed 37.9 million visitors who stayed overnight in 2018, of whom 13.6 million were international. Major destinations include the Empire State Building, Ellis Island, the Statue of Liberty on Liberty Island, Broadway theatre productions, Central Park, Times Square, Coney Island, the Financial District, museums, and sports stadiums. Other major visitor activities include luxury shopping along Fifth and Madison Avenues; entertainment events such as the Tribeca Film Festival; Randalls Island music festivals such as Governors Ball, Panorama and Electric Zoo; and free performances in Central Park at Summerstage and Delacorte Theater. Many New York City ethnic enclaves, such as Jackson Heights, Flushing, and Brighton Beach are major shopping destinations for first and second generation Americans.

New York City has over 28,000 acres (110 km^{2}) of parkland and 14 linear miles (22 km) of public beaches. Manhattan's Central Park, designed by Frederick Law Olmsted and Calvert Vaux, is the most visited city park in the United States. Prospect Park in Brooklyn, also designed by Olmsted and Vaux, has a 90-acre (36 ha) meadow. Flushing Meadows–Corona Park in Queens, the city's fourth-largest, was the setting for the 1939 World's Fair and 1964 World's Fair.

== Industry ==
| Year | Total visitors (millions) | Domestic visitors | International visitors | Total visitor spending billions (US$) |
|---|---|---|---|---|
| 1991 | 29.1 | 23.6 | 5.5 | 10.1 |
| 1995 | 28.5 | 23.1 | 5.4 | 11.7 |
| 1998 | 33.1 | 27.1 | 6.0 | 14.7 |
| 1999 | 36.4 | 29.8 | 6.6 | 15.6 |
| 2000 | 36.2 | 29.4 | 6.8 | 17.0 |
| 2001 | 35.2 | 29.5 | 5.7 | 15.1 |
| 2002 | 35.3 | 30.2 | 5.1 | 14.1 |
| 2003 | 37.8 | 33.0 | 4.8 | 18.5 |
| 2004 | 39.9 | 33.8 | 6.2 | 21.3 |
| 2005 | 42.6 | 35.8 | 6.8 | 24.3 |
| 2006 | 43.8 | 36.5 | 7.3 | 26.2 |
| 2007 | 46.0 | 37.1 | 8.8 | 30.0 |
| 2008 | 47.1 | 37.6 | 9.5 | 32.0 |
| 2009 | 45.8 | 37.0 | 8.8 | 28.2 |
| 2010 | 48.8 | 39.1 | 9.7 | 31.5 |
| 2011 | 50.9 | 40.3 | 10.3 | 34.5 |
| 2012 | 51.5 | 40.9 | 10.6 | 36.9 |
| 2013 | 53 | 41.7 | 11.3 | 38.8 |
| 2014 | 54.4 | 42.5 | 11.9 | 41.2 |
| 2015 | 55.9 | 43.2 | 12.7 | 42.3 |
| 2016 | 60.5 | 47.8 | 12.7 | 43.0 |
| 2017 | 62.8 | 49.7 | 13.1 | 44.2 |
| 2018 | 65.2 | 51.6 | 13.5 | 44.0 |
| 2019 | 66.6 | 53.1 | 13.5 | 47.4 |
| 2020 | 22.3 | 19.9 | 2.4 | 12.8 |
| 2021 | 32.9 | 30.2 | 2.7 | |

According to NYC & Company, the official destination marketing organization for the city, the top producing countries for international visitors to New York City in 2011 were the United Kingdom (1,055,000), Canada (1,033,000), Brazil (718,000), France (662,000), Germany (587,000), Australia (532,000), Italy (495,000), China (427,000), Spain (422,000), Mexico (376,000), and Japan (299,000). With the exception of slight peaks around Thanksgiving, Christmas and New Year, visitor arrival rates are roughly the same year-round. New York has one of the highest hotel-occupancy rates in the country. Arrivals have remained relatively high even since the Great Recession. The city lost a third of its hotel rooms during the COVID-19 pandemic, while room revenue was down more than $150 a room in the remaining ones. The dip was enough for the American Hotel and Lodging Association to put it in the "depression" category. Only San Francisco, Boston and Washington, D.C. fared worse.

In 2017, there were an estimated 62.8 million visitors to the city, including daytrippers, of which 49.7 million were domestic.

Double-decker tour buses and boats with tour guides bring sightseers to various parts of Manhattan and other boroughs. The charter bus industry has thousands of companies providing toured transportation services for groups visiting the city. The most known ones are Academy, Leprechaun, Peter Pan, Megabus. Other tourists rent bicycles at neighborhood shops or along the Manhattan Waterfront Greenway or simply walk.

Many visitors investigate their genealogy at historic immigration sites such as Ellis Island and the Statue of Liberty. Other tourist destinations include the Empire State Building, for 41 years the world's tallest building after its construction in 1931, Radio City Music Hall, home of The Rockettes, a variety of Broadway shows, the Intrepid Sea-Air-Space Museum, housed on a World War II aircraft carrier, and city landmarks such as Central Park, one of the finest examples of landscape architecture in the world. New York City has encouraged tourist shopping by eliminating its sales tax on clothing and footwear. In the past, the World Trade Center was an important tourist destination before the September 11 attacks, which devastated the city and its tourist industry. Tourists were scarce for months, and it took two years for the numbers to fully rebound with fewer international, but more domestic visitors, due in part to an emphasis on "patriotic tourism". The World Trade Center site itself became an important place to visit, and visits to the World Trade Center have increased, especially with openings of new buildings on the site in recent years.

Street fairs and street events such as the Labor Day Carnival in Brooklyn, Halloween Parade in Greenwich Village, and New York Marathon also attract tourists.

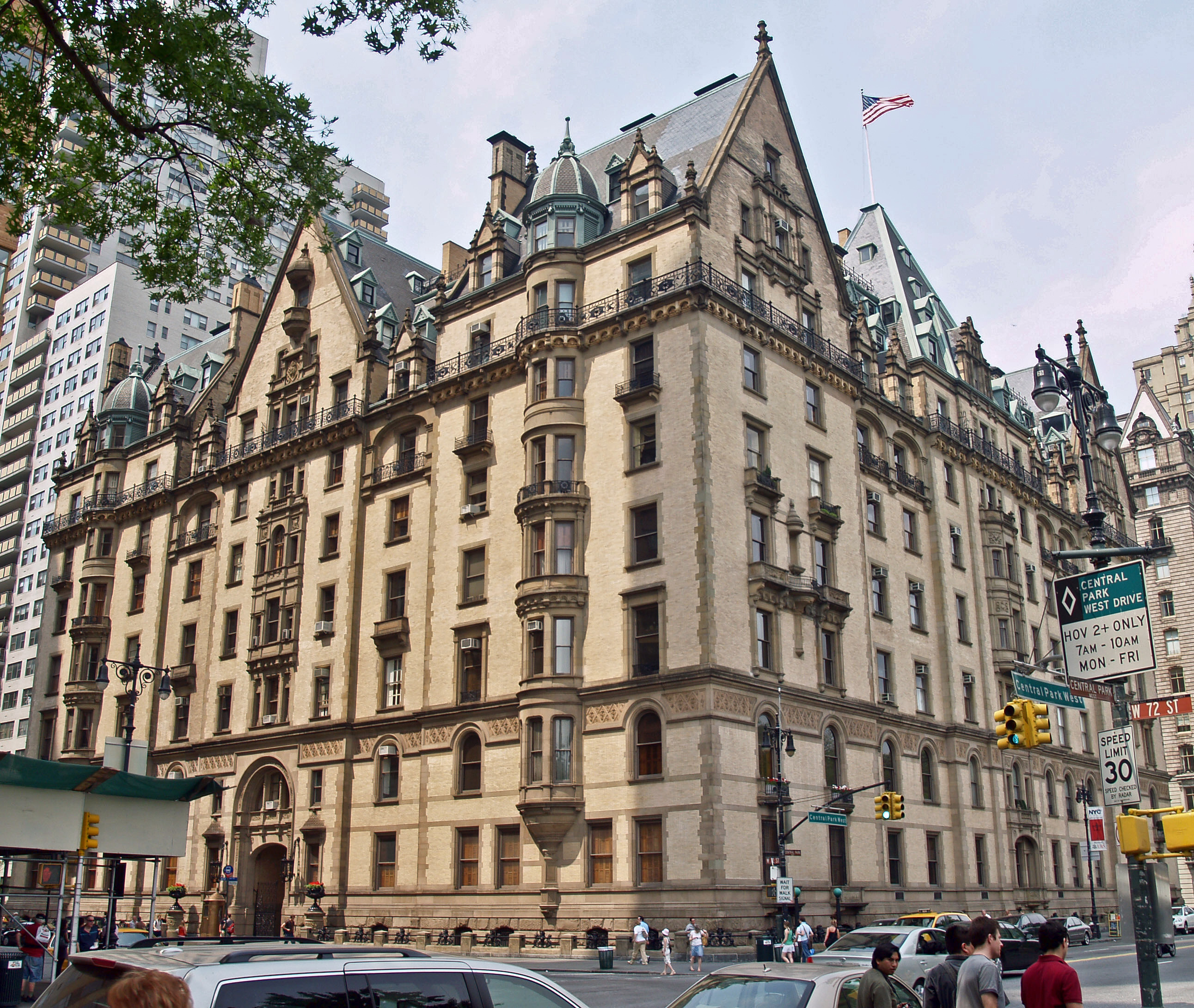
The Dakota on Central Park West

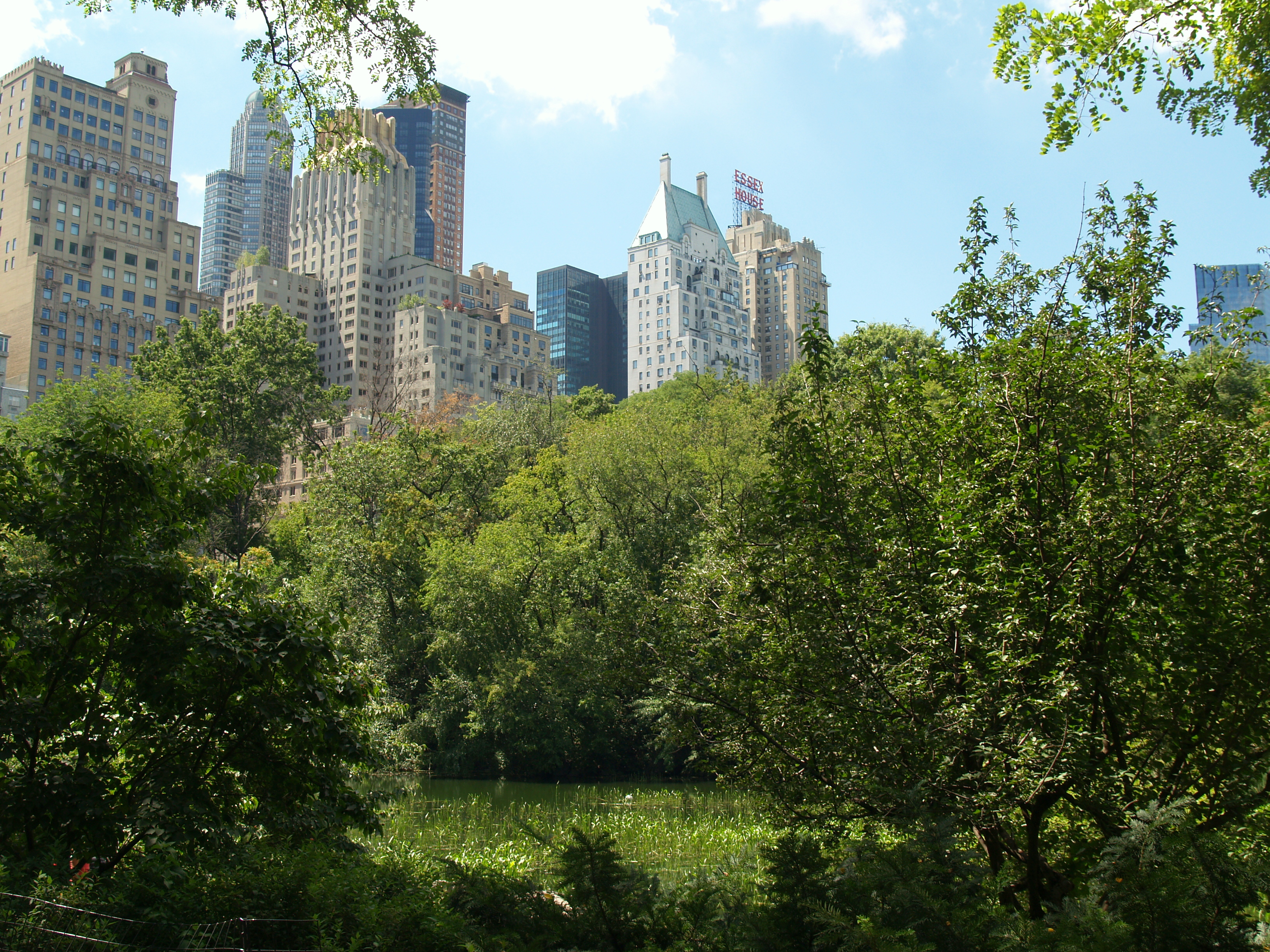
View from Central Park of buildings along Central Park South, including Essex House

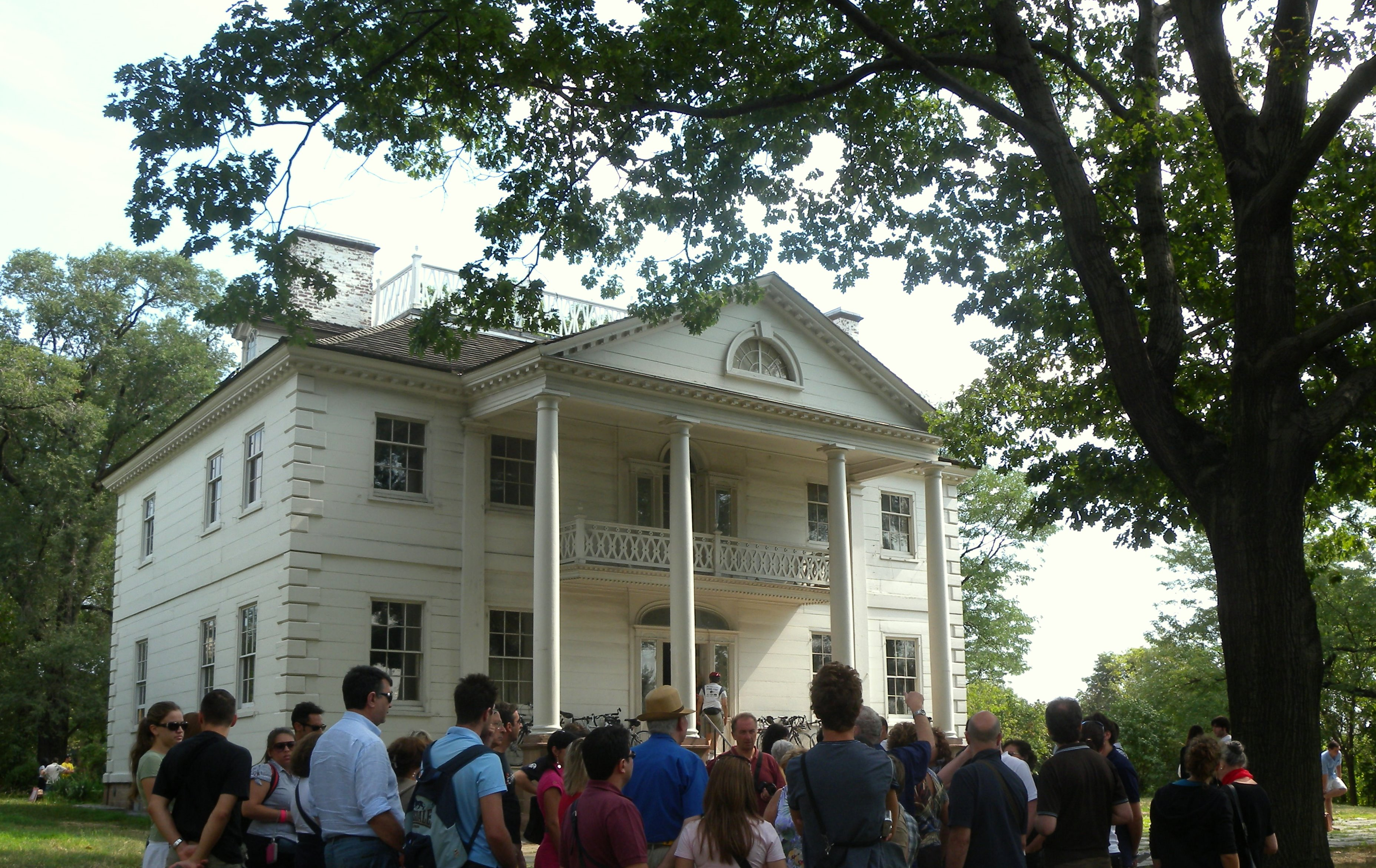
Tour guide lecturing in Italian at Morris-Jumel Mansion

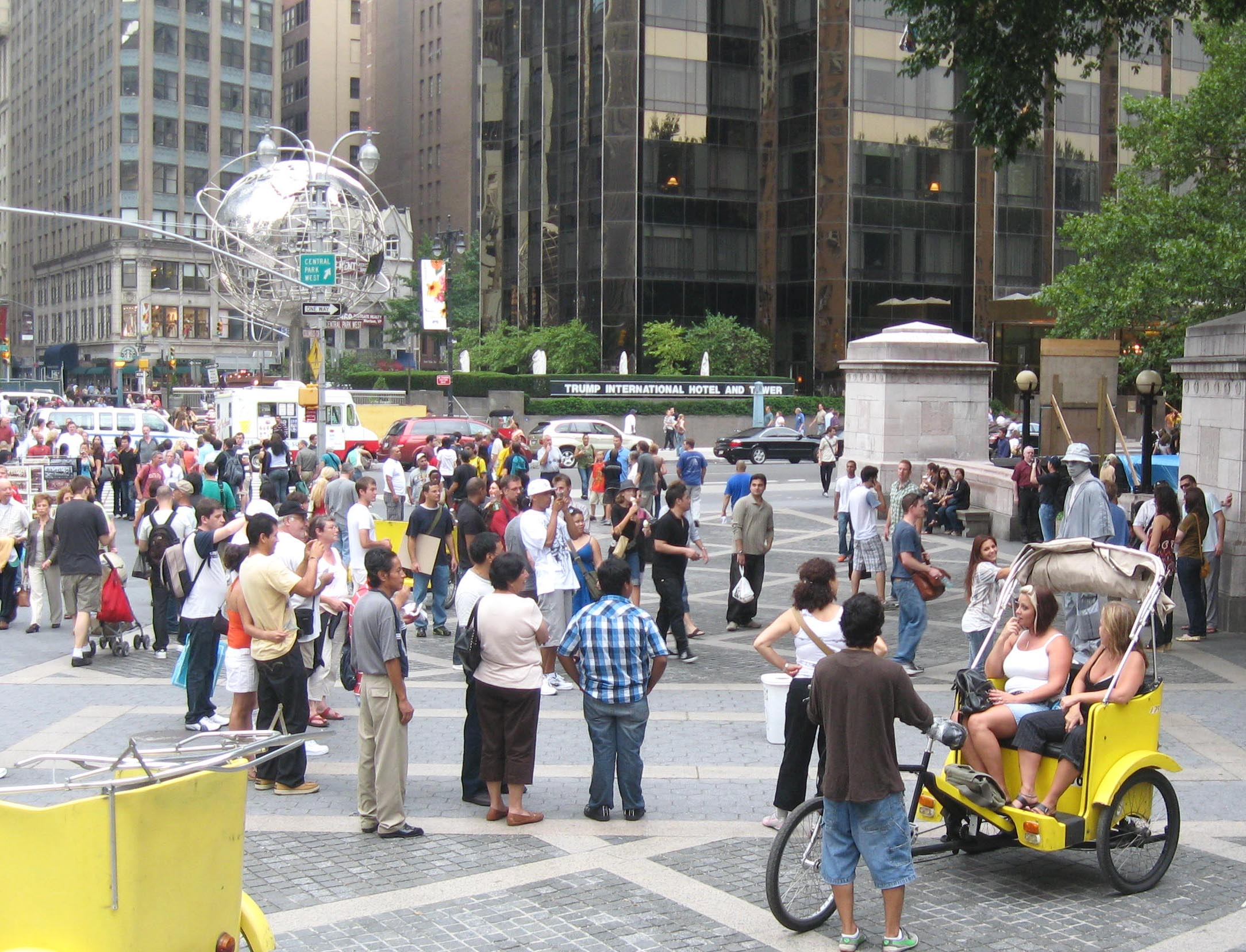
Tourists gather around a busker in Columbus Circle.

== Tourism companies ==
New York City law requires all guides to be licensed by the Department of Consumer Affairs. A professional trade organization of licensed tour guides in the city is GANYC (Guides Association of NYC), which represents just 10.9% of all licensed tour guides in the city. Potential licensees must pay a fee and take a compulsory 150-question examination about New York City topics, of which they must get at least 97 questions correct. As of 2018, over 3,000 guides have certification.

In 1992, the "Greeter" initiative was founded by Lynn Brooks with the association "Big Apple Greeter" in New York City. The voluntary and personal hosting of tourists should improve the bad image of the megacity. More "Greeter" projects followed in other United States cities and worldwide. More than 300 volunteers "greet" over 7,000 visitors per year in New York City as of 2010.

NYC & Company, the city's official convention and visitor bureau, is currently headed by Fred Dixon. It has offices in 14 countries, including Brazil, Britain, France, Germany, Ireland, Italy, Mexico, The Netherlands, Russia, Spain, Sweden, Japan, Korea and China. NYC & Company is the official source of tourism statistics for the city. The research department develops and distributes comprehensive information on NYC domestic and international visitor statistics and monitors the travel industry's impact on New York City's economy. The department also produces 14 official New York City tourism marketing publications that feature information on member hotels, museums, attractions, theaters, stores, restaurants, meeting venues, and service providers. Limo services for Rockefeller Center tours are available from various providers.

== Special interest tours ==
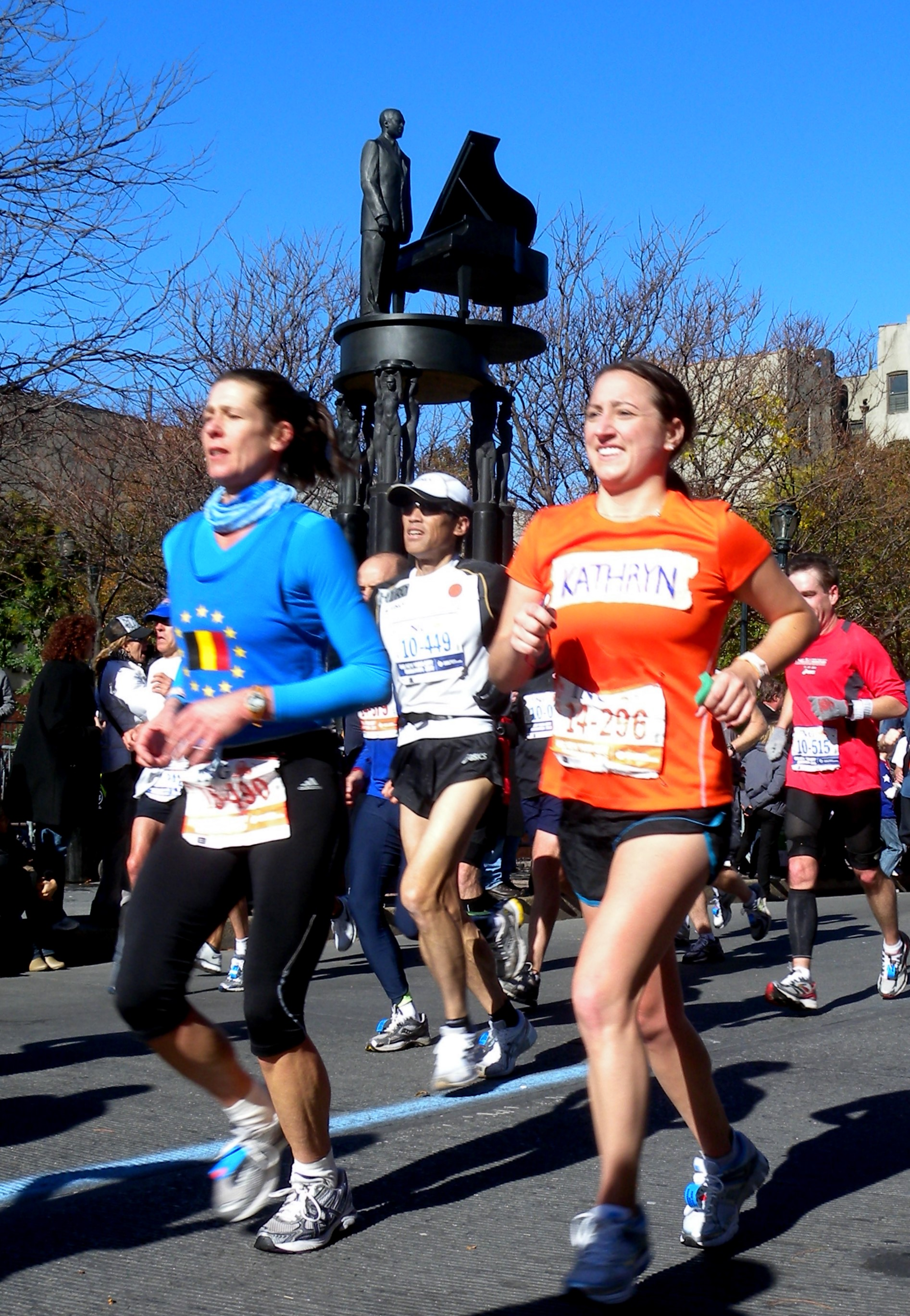
New York City Marathon in Harlem with the Duke Ellington Memorial in the background

New York City has a rich musical culture and history. Accordingly, numerous jazz, gospel music, rock and roll, rhythm and blues and hip hop tours are available. Popular locations for music tours include Harlem and the East Village, which is home to several historical sites related to the birth of punk music. Walking tours are one of the most popular ways of seeing the city and many private guides supply tours. Companies producing audio walking tours include the Gesso app.

Food tours are another option for visitors. New York is one of the top culinary destinations in the world. New York's food culture, influenced by the city's immigrants and large number of dining patrons, is diverse. Jewish and Italian immigrants made the city famous for bagels, cheesecake and New York-style pizza. Some 4,000 mobile food vendors, many of them immigrants, are licensed by the city and have made Middle Eastern foods such as falafel and kebabs standbys of contemporary New York street food. The city is also home to many of the finest haute cuisine restaurants in the United States. Food tours allow visitors to try a wide variety of these foods economically and learn about the city's culture. Tour companies include New York Food Tours, Local Finds Queens Food Tours and Rum and Blackbird Tasting Tours.

Visitors to New York City also partake in sports tourism. Sporting events draw tourists to major venues such as the Yankee Stadium, Citi Field, and Madison Square Garden, and to street events such as the New York City Marathon.

== Most visited attractions ==
All of the below attractions are located in Manhattan unless otherwise stated. Only attractions with more than 2 million visitors are listed. The most visited attractions in New York City include:

| Name | Image | Location | Estimated number of visitors (millions) | As of | Ref. |
|---|---|---|---|---|---|
| Central Park | | between 5th and 8th Aves, between W 59th and W 110th Sts 40°46′56″N 73°57′55″W | 42.0 | 2016 | |
| Times Square | | Broadway and 7th Avenue between W 42nd and W 47th Sts 40°45′25″N 73°59′10″W | 39.5 | 2014 | |
| Grand Central Terminal | | Park Ave between E 42nd and E 45th Sts 40°45′10″N 73°58′38″W | 21.6 | 2014 | |
| Theater District (including Broadway theatres) | | between 6th and 8th Aves, between 40th and 54th Sts 40°45′32″N 73°59′06″W | 13.0 | 2018 | |
| Rockefeller Center (including Top of the Rock) | | between 5th and 6th Aves, between W 48th and W 51st Sts 40°45′31″N 73°58′45″W | 12.8 | 2018 | |
| Bryant Park | | between 5th and 6th Aves, between W 40th and W 42nd Sts 40°45′14″N 73°59′02″W | 12.0 | 2017 | |
| Prospect Park | | between 8th, Flatbush, Ocean, Parkside Aves, and Prospect Pk SW (Brooklyn) 40°39′42″N 73°58′15″W | 10.0 | 2017 | |
| South Street Seaport | | South St and Fulton St 40°42′22″N 74°0′12″W | 9.0 | 2014 | |
| High Line | | west of 10th Ave between Gansevoort and W 34th Sts 40°44′53″N 74°00′17″W | 7.6 | 2015 | |
| Coney Island (including amusement parks and boardwalk) | | southern shore of Brooklyn 40°34′26″N 73°58′41″W | 7.4 | 2017 | |
| National September 11 Memorial | | between West, Vesey, Greenwich, and Liberty Sts 40°42′42″N 74°00′49″W | 6.8 | 2017 | |
| Metropolitan Museum of Art | | 5th Ave and E 82nd St 40°46′46″N 73°57′47″W | 7.0 | 2019 | |
| Rockaway Beach | | Rockaway, Queens 40°35′10″N 73°48′43″W | 5.5 | 2017 | |
| American Museum of Natural History | | between Columbus Ave, Central Park W, and W 77th and W 81st Sts 40°46′50″N 73°58′29″W | 5.0 | 2018 | |
| Statue of Liberty and Ellis Island | | Statue of Liberty National Monument (off the coast of Manhattan) 40°41′39″N 74°02′35″W | 4.5 | 2016 | |
| Empire State Building | | 5th Ave and W 34th St 40°44′54″N 73°59′08″W | 4.0 | 2015 | |
| National September 11 Museum | | Greenwich St and Cortlandt Way 40°42′41″N 74°00′45″W | 3.1 | 2017 | |
| Museum of Modern Art | | 11 W 53rd St 40°45′42″N 73°58′39″W | 2.8 | 2016 | |
| One World Trade Center | | West St and Vesey St 40°42′47″N 74°0′49″W | 2.3 | 2015 | |
| Bronx Zoo | | 2300 Southern Boulevard, Bronx 40°51′1″N 73°52′43″W | 2.15 | 2009 | |

Notes:

- Many of these counts also include residents and workers as well. In addition, the actual visitor counts may be greatly inflated since a single person may be counted multiple times if they visited the attraction more than once a year. For this reason, modes of transport such as the Staten Island Ferry and Brooklyn Bridge are excluded, as are neighborhoods such as Greenwich Village, Harlem, and the Financial District.
- Brooklyn Bridge Park, which saw 4.62 million visitors in summer 2016, is excluded because annual statistics are not available. However, Coney Island and Rockaway Beach are included since they are seasonal destinations.
- The Battery, the port of departure for Statue of Liberty and Ellis Island tourist ferries, is excluded.
- Sports stadiums are also excluded since annual attendance may fluctuate greatly from year to year.

== Tourism tax ==
Like other cities, New York City charges a hotel tax. Exact rates can vary greatly, but are usually expressed as a percentage of the total room cost plus the hotel room occupancy tax rate.

== See also ==
- List of famous buildings, sites, and monuments in New York City
- List of museums and cultural institutions in New York City
- Lists of New York City landmarks
- Parks and recreation in New York City
- I Love New York
- Hotels in New York City
