= Frederick Douglass Circle =

Traffic circle in Manhattan, New York

Coordinates: 40.800583°N 73.958167°W

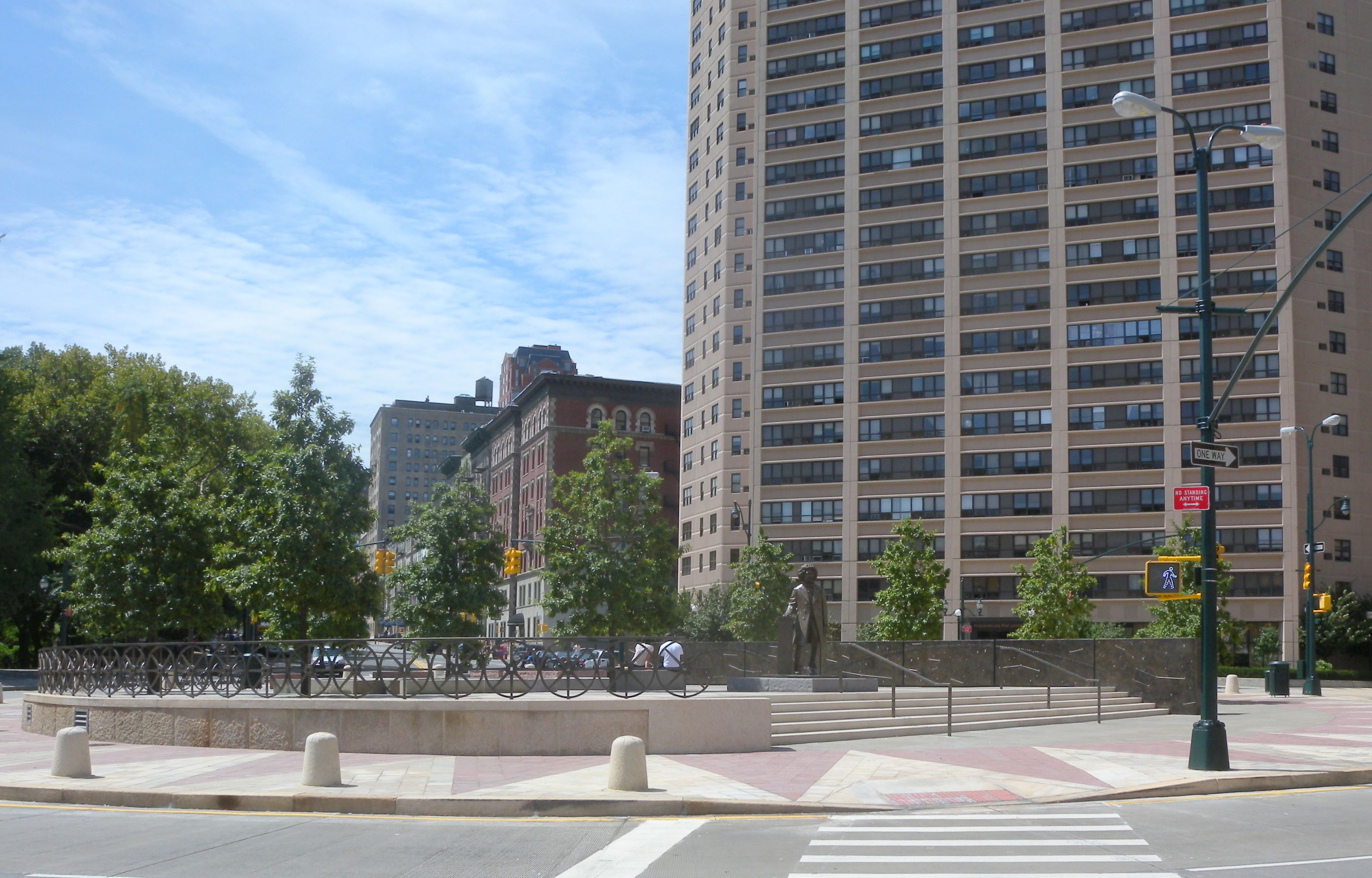
The plaza shortly after its 2010 completion

Frederick Douglass Circle is a traffic circle located at the northwest corner of Central Park at the intersection of Eighth Avenue (Frederick Douglass Boulevard and Central Park West) and 110th Street (Cathedral Parkway and Central Park North) in the New York City borough of Manhattan. The traffic circle is named for the American abolitionist, women's suffragist, editor, orator, author, statesman, and reformer Frederick Douglass.

Frederick Douglass Circle connects the New York City neighborhoods of Harlem with the Upper West Side. Harlem, a major African-American residential, cultural, and business center, is to the north and east of the intersection. Cathedral Parkway climbs westward from here into Morningside Heights, which includes Columbia University, the Manhattan School of Music, and the Cathedral of St. John the Divine.

== Plaza ==
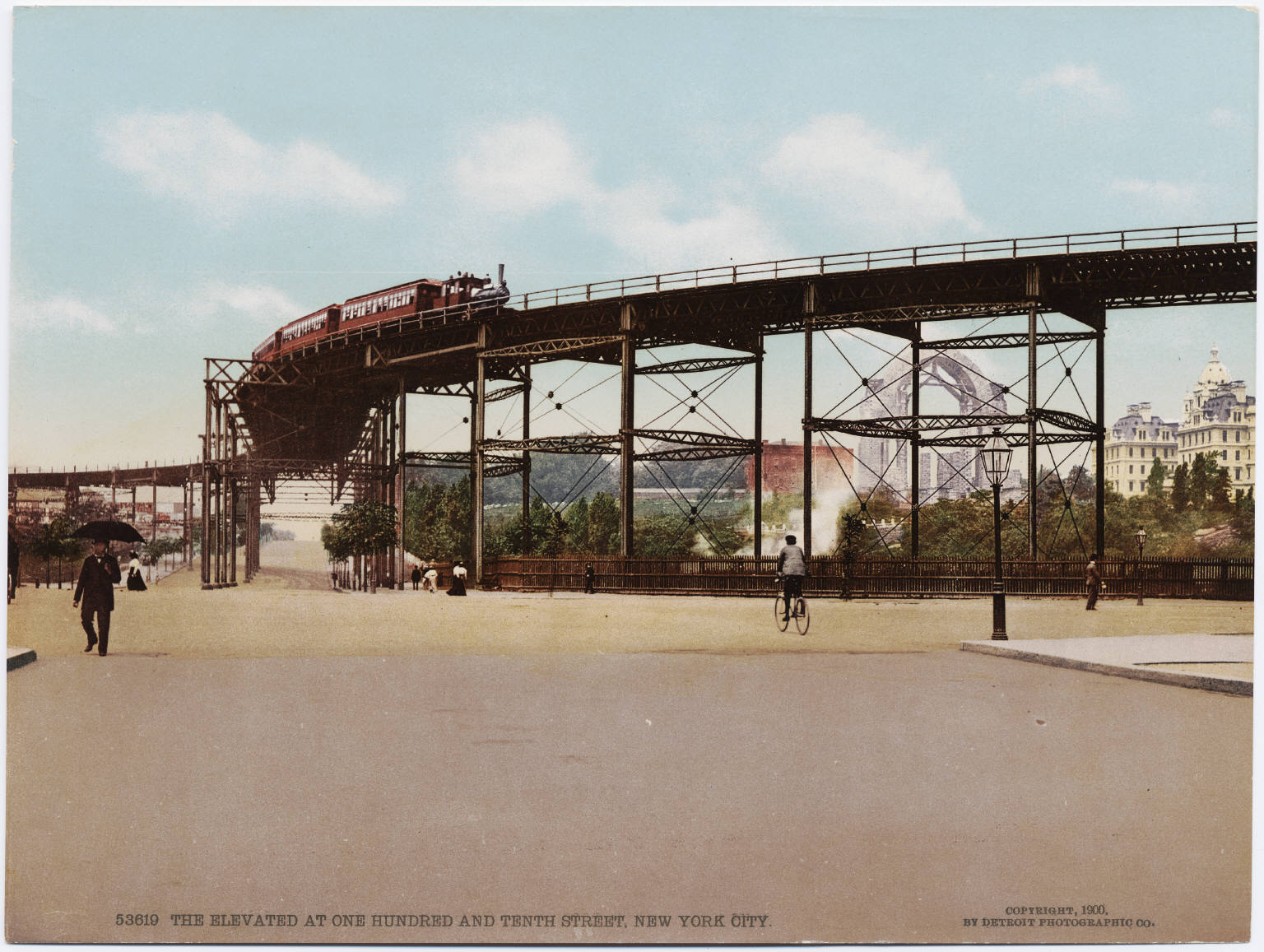
IRT Ninth Avenue Line in 1900

Although a ceremony was held to name the circle after Frederick Douglass on September 17, 1950, the pedestrian plaza in the center of the intersection was not completed until June 2, 2010. In 1993, local residents and the Central Park Conservancy began developing plans to redesign the circle and make it symmetrical with Duke Ellington Circle at the northeast corner of Central Park. Construction on the pedestrian plaza began in 2004 and was to be completed in one year. However, due to numerous construction delays, the plaza was not completed until June 2, 2010.

The traffic circle features a complex colored paving pattern that alludes to traditional black quilt designs. Harlem-based artist Algernon Miller designed the paving. Additional features, including wrought-iron symbolic and decorative elements, a water wall, and inscribed historical details and quotations representing the life of Frederick Douglass and the slaves’ passage to freedom. A central bronze sculpture, depicting a standing Frederick Douglass, has been crafted by Hungarian-born artist Gabriel Koren.

== Transportation ==
The B and C trains of the New York City Subway stop at Cathedral Parkway – 110th Street under Frederick Douglass Circle, while the M3, M4, and M10 bus lines stop at the circle. In addition, the M7 and M116 buses and the 2 and 3 trains at 110th Street–Malcolm X Plaza stop near Frederick Douglass Circle. Until 1940, this was also the site of the "Suicide Curve" of the IRT Ninth Avenue Line.
