= Duke Ellington Circle =

Traffic circle in Manhattan, New York

- Frawley Circle
- Interactive map of Duke Ellington Circle

Location
- Harlem, Manhattan
- Coordinates: 40.796872°N 73.949236°W
- Roads at junction: Fifth Avenue; Central Park North; East 110th Street

Construction
- Type: Traffic circle
- Maintained by: NYCDOT

Duke Ellington Circle is a traffic circle located at the northeast corner of Central Park at the intersection of Fifth Avenue and 110th Street in Harlem, Manhattan, New York City. The traffic circle is named for the jazz musician Duke Ellington.

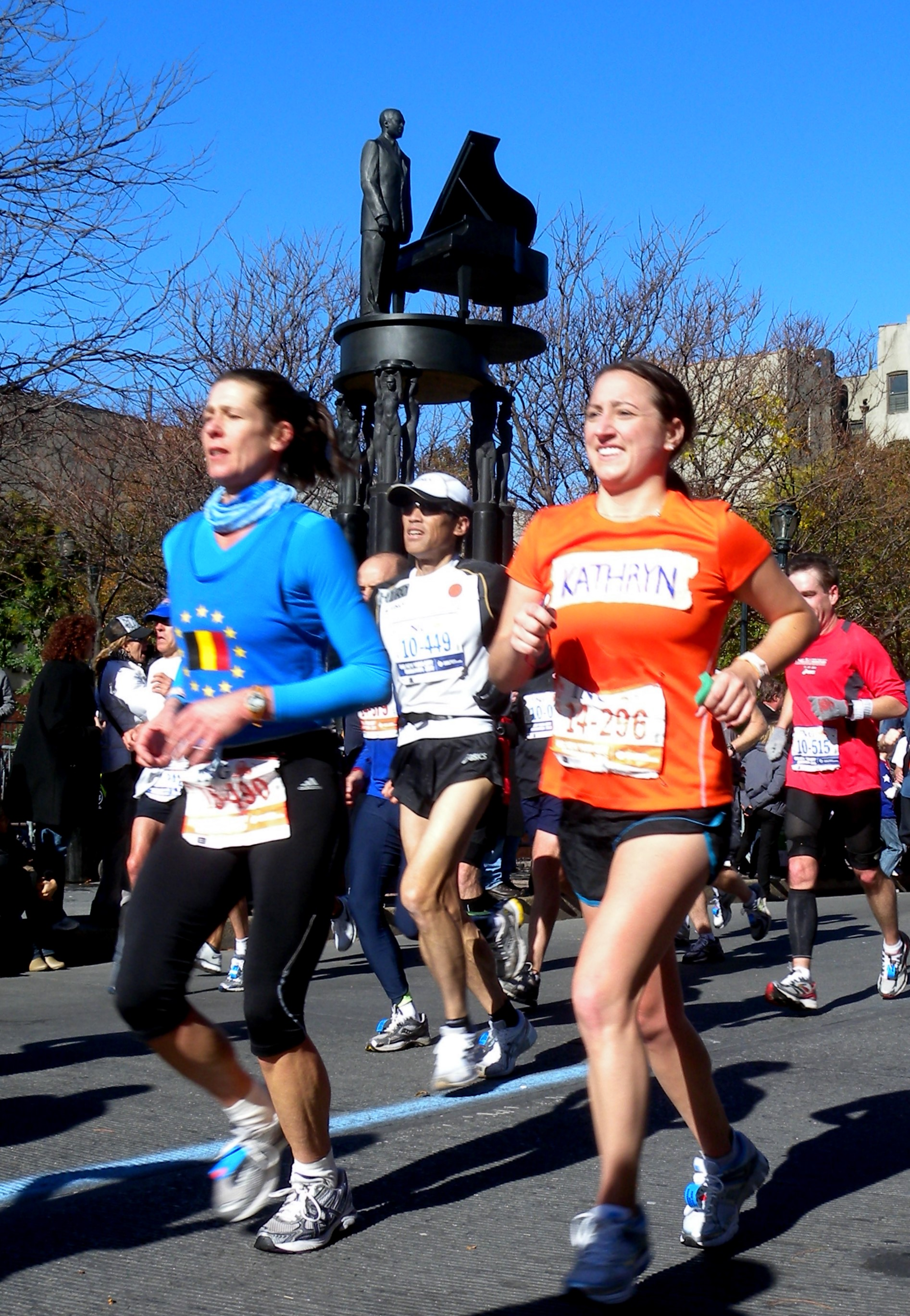
2010 New York City Marathon runners pass through the circle with the Duke Ellington Memorial in the background

== Plaza ==
Formerly named "Frawley Circle", the traffic circle was renamed "Duke Ellington Circle" in 1995. In 1997, the Duke Ellington Memorial by sculptor Robert Graham was erected in the middle of the shallow amphitheater composing the circle. Though the circle diverts the flow of 110th Street, Fifth Avenue maintains a direct route through the intersection.

A new main location for the Museum for African Art designed by Robert A.M. Stern Architects opened at the circle in 2019 and was the first addition to New York City's Museum Mile in decades.

== Neighborhoods ==
Duke Ellington Circle connects the New York City neighborhoods of Harlem with East Harlem. Harlem, which since the 1920s has been as a major African-American residential, cultural, and business center is to the north and west of the intersection, while East Harlem is located to the east. The nearest area of Central Park to the circle is the Harlem Meer.

== Transportation ==
The M1, M2, M3 and M4 New York City Bus routes serve the vicinity of the circle. In addition, the 2 and 3 trains of the New York City Subway stop nearby at 110th Street–Malcolm X Plaza, while the 6 and <6> trains stop at 110th Street and Lexington Avenue.
