= 2010 New York City Marathon =

Footrace held in New York City

41st New York City Marathon
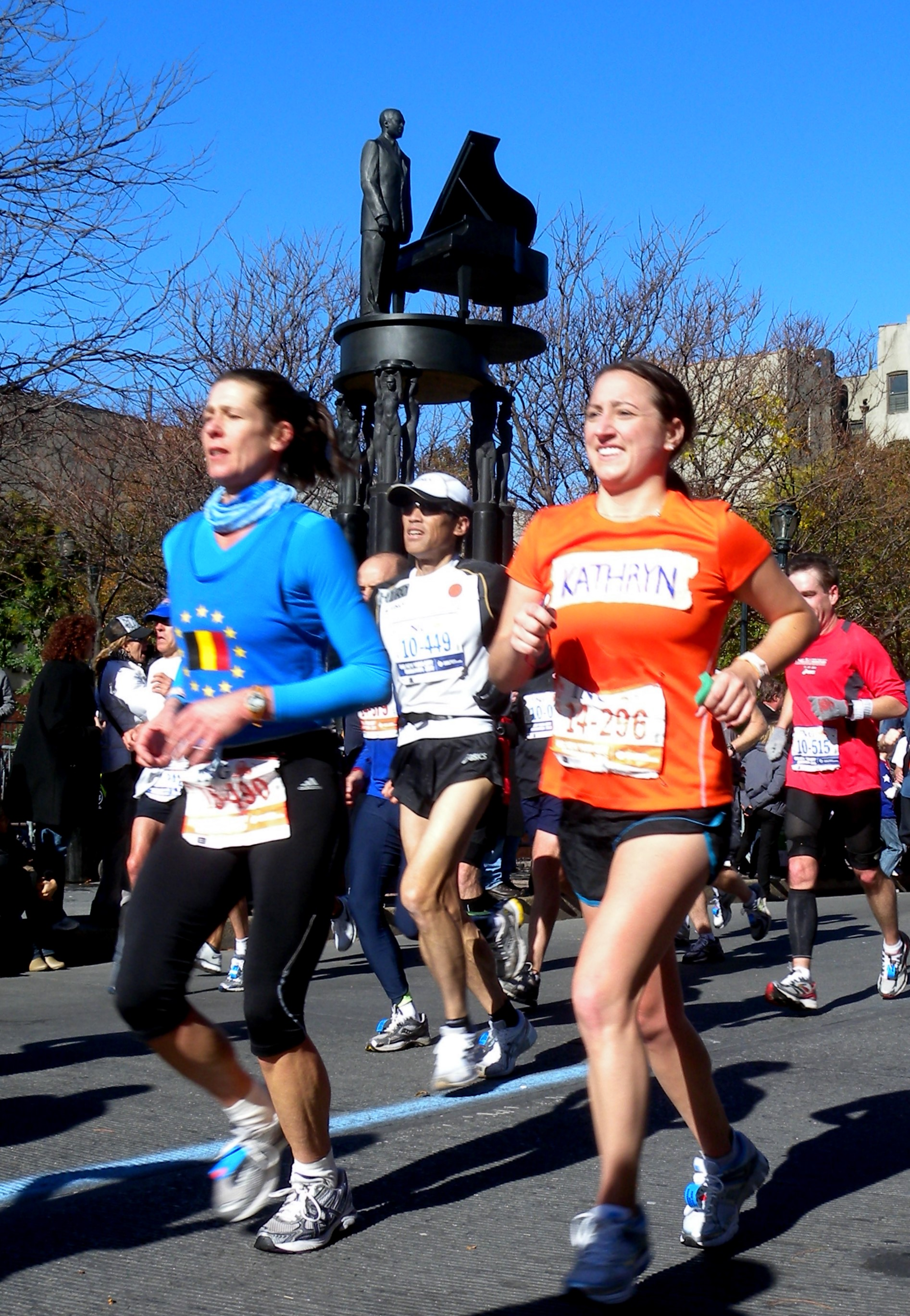
- Runners at Fifth Avenue, Harlem, with the Duke Ellington Memorial in the background
- Location: New York City, New York
- Date: November 7, 2010

Champions
- Men: Gebregziabher Gebremariam (2:08:14)
- Women: Edna Kiplagat (2:28:20)
- Wheelchair men: David Weir (1:37:29)
- Wheelchair women: Tatyana McFadden (2:02:22)

The 2010 New York City Marathon was the 41st running of the annual marathon race in New York City, New York, which took place on Sunday, November 7. Sponsored by ING Group, the competition was the fifth World Marathon Major of 2010 and an IAAF Gold Label Road Race. A record 45,344 people were entered into the race. Ethiopian runner Gebregziabher Gebremariam won the men's race in a time of two hours, eight minutes and fourteen seconds on his debut performance over the distance. Edna Kiplagat of Kenya took first place in the women's race with her winning time of 2:28:20.

The pre-race favorite for the men's competition was Haile Gebrselassie, the marathon world record holder. However, he dropped out in the final ten miles (16 km) of the race due to a knee injury and later declared that he was retiring from competition, bringing a close to one of the most successful careers in long-distance running which included eight world titles and 27 world best marks.

In the wheelchair races, Great Britain's David Weir (1:37:29) and America's Tatyana McFadden (2:02:22) won the men's and women's divisions, respectively. In the handcycle race, Americans Dane Pilon (1:21:23) and Helene Hines (2:02:16) were the winners.

Among the fun runners in the marathon event was Edison Peña, a Chilean miner who was saved from the 2010 Copiapó mining accident the previous month. He was invited to the competition as he had used running as a means of maintaining hope during the 69-day period he spent underground. He completed the distance in 5 hours, 40 minutes, 51 seconds.

A total of 44,704 runners finished the race, 28,661 men and 16,043 women.

== Results ==
=== Men ===
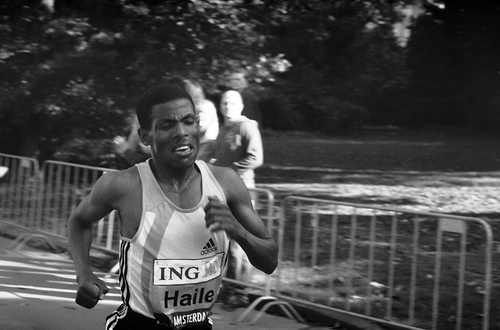
Pre-race favorite Haile Gebrselassie, seen here in Amsterdam, dropped out and announced his retirement.

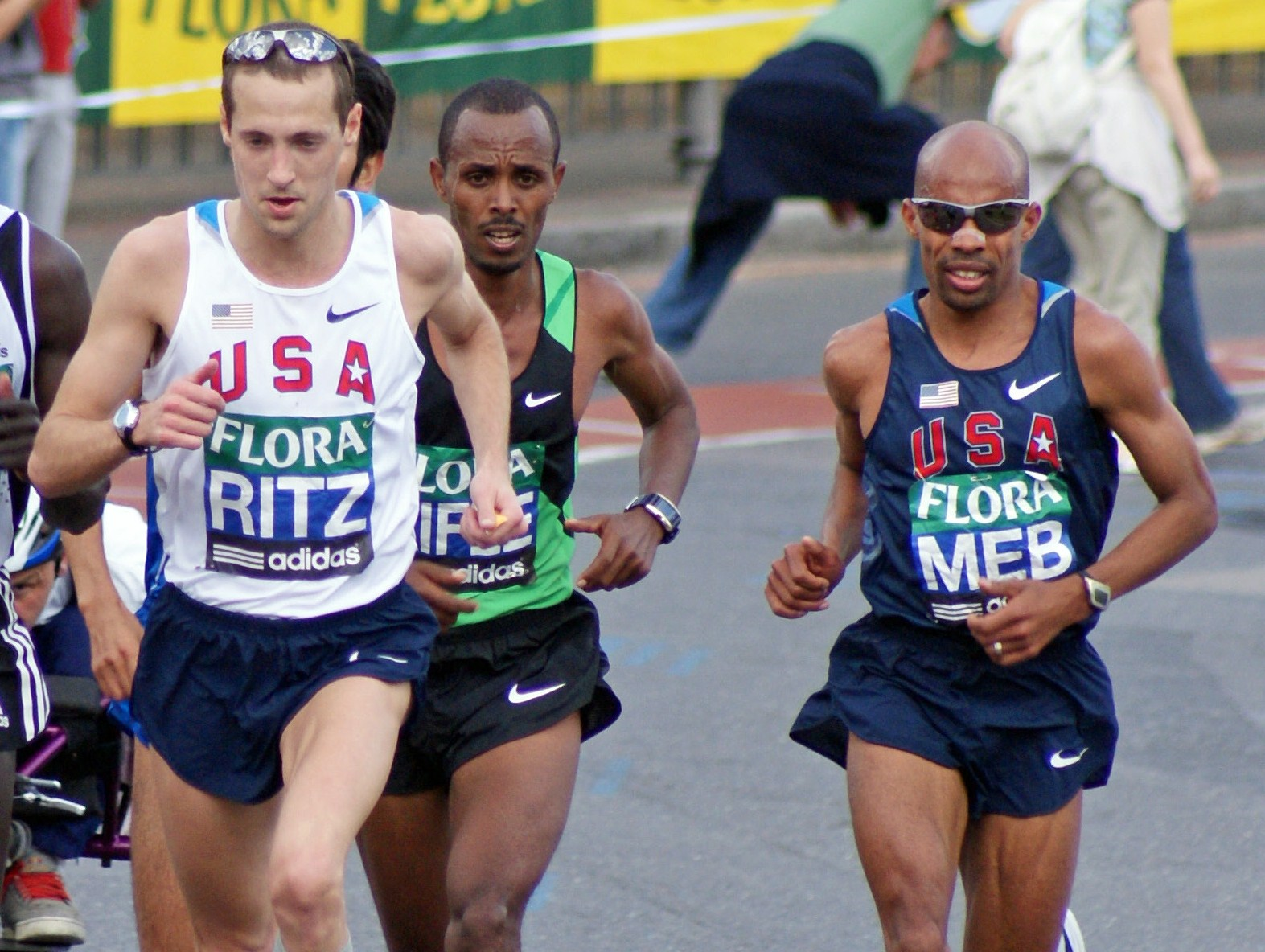
Defending champion Meb Keflezighi, seen here in London, was sixth and Dathan Ritzenhein took eighth.

Position	Athlete	Nationality	Time
1st place, gold medalist(s)	Gebregziabher Gebremariam	Ethiopia	2:08:14
2nd place, silver medalist(s)	Emmanuel Kipchirchir Mutai	Kenya	2:09:18
3rd place, bronze medalist(s)	Moses Kigen Kipkosgei	Kenya	2:10:39
4	James Kwambai	Kenya	2:11:31
5	Meb Keflezighi	United States	2:11:38
6	Marílson Gomes dos Santos	Brazil	2:11:51
7	Dathan Ritzenhein	United States	2:12:33
8	Abel Kirui	Kenya	2:13:01
9	Abderrahime Bouramdane	Morocco	2:14:07
10	Jorge Torres	United States	2:14:57
11	Peter Kamais	Kenya	2:14:58
12	Tim Nelson	United States	2:15:06
13	Abdelkabir Saji	Morocco	2:16:35
14	Dereje Hailegeorgis	Ethiopia	2:19:10
15	Teklu Deneke	Ethiopia	2:19:23
16	Matthew Downin	United States	2:20:41
17	Fikadu Lemma	Ethiopia	2:20:47
18	Bazu Worku	Ethiopia	2:22:17
19	Filippo Lo Piccolo	Italy	2:23:10
20	Odilon Cuautle	Mexico	2:24:03
—	Abderrahim Goumri	Morocco	DQ
—	Arata Fujiwara	Japan	DNF
—	Deresse Denboba	Ethiopia	DNF
—	Haile Gebrselassie	Ethiopia	DNF
—	Viktor Röthlin	Switzerland	DNF
—	Hendrick Ramaala	South Africa	DNF
—	Simon Bairu	Canada	DNF
—	Ketema Nigusse	Ethiopia	DNF
—	Mohammed Awol	Ethiopia	DNF
—	Germán Silva	Mexico	DNF

- Abderrahim Goumri of Morocco was the original fourth place athlete in 2:10:51, but was subsequently disqualified due to doping.

=== Women ===
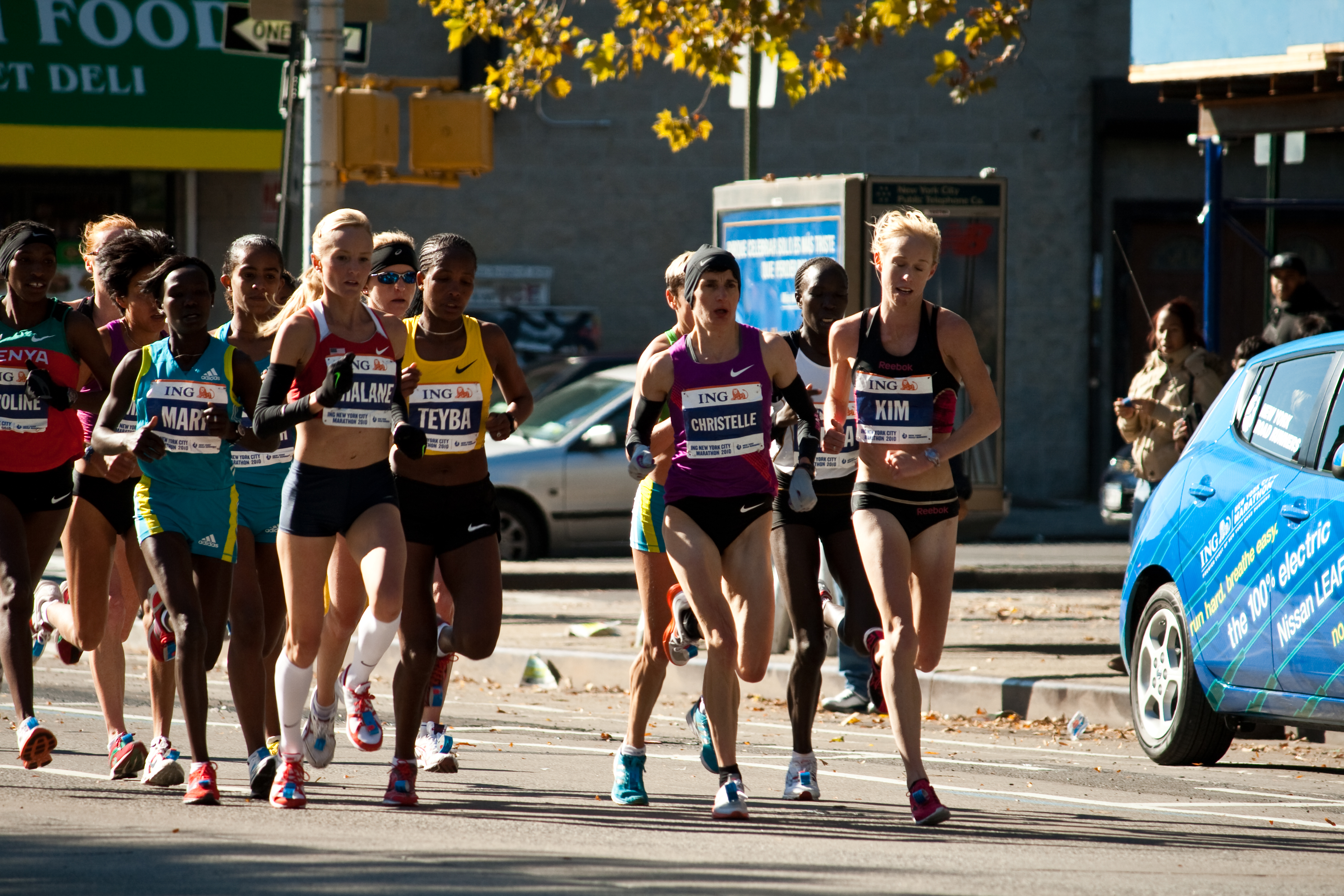
Action from the women's elite race

Position	Athlete	Nationality	Time
1st place, gold medalist(s)	Edna Kiplagat	Kenya	2:28:20
2nd place, silver medalist(s)	Shalane Flanagan	United States	2:28:40
3rd place, bronze medalist(s)	Mary Jepkosgei Keitany	Kenya	2:29:01
4	Kim Smith	New Zealand	2:29:28
5	Christelle Daunay	France	2:29:29
6	Lyudmila Petrova	Russia	2:29:41
7	Caroline Rotich	Kenya	2:29:46
8	Madaí Pérez	Mexico	2:29:53
9	Bizunesh Deba	Ethiopia	2:29:55
10	Katie McGregor	United States	2:31:01
11	Teyba Erkesso	Ethiopia	2:31:06
12	Mara Yamauchi	United Kingdom	2:31:38
13	Derartu Tulu	Ethiopia	2:32:46
14	Tatyana Pushkareva	Russia	2:34:05
15	Salina Kosgei	Kenya	2:34:14
16	Kathy Newberry	United States	2:35:23
17	Claire Hallissey	United Kingdom	2:36:13
18	Serena Burla	United States	2:37:06
19	Alissa McKaig	United States	2:37:29
20	Misiker Mekonen	Ethiopia	2:37:39
—	Inga Abitova	Russia	DQ
—	Ana Dulce Félix	Portugal	DNF

- Inga Abitova of Russia was initially fourth in a time of 2:29:17, but her result was subsequently annulled due to doping.

=== Wheelchair men ===
Position	Athlete	Nationality	Time
1st place, gold medalist(s)	David Weir	United Kingdom	1:37:29
2nd place, silver medalist(s)	Masazumi Soejima	Japan	1:37:31
3rd place, bronze medalist(s)	Kurt Fearnley	Australia	1:38:44
4	Krige Schabort	United States	1:39:37
5	Aarón Gordian	Mexico	1:40:35
6	Kota Hokinoue	Japan	1:42:44
7	Josh Cassidy	Canada	1:42:48
8	Ernst van Dyk	South Africa	1:47:10
9	Rafael Botello	Spain	1:47:39
10	Denis Lemeunier	France	1:48:04

=== Wheelchair women ===
Position	Athlete	Nationality	Time
1st place, gold medalist(s)	Tatyana McFadden	United States	2:02:22
2nd place, silver medalist(s)	Christina Ripp	United States	2:08:05
3rd place, bronze medalist(s)	Amanda McGrory	United States	2:09:42
4	Diane Roy	Canada	2:11:50
5	Sandra Graf	Switzerland	2:13:03
6	Francesca Porcellato	Italy	2:15:23
7	Shelly Woods	United Kingdom	2:15:25
8	Sandra Hager	Switzerland	2:29:12
9	Chantal Petitclerc	Canada	2:35:54
10	Sandi Rush	United States	2:48:46

=== Handcycle men ===
Position	Athlete	Nationality	Time
1st place, gold medalist(s)	Dane Pilon	United States	1:21:23
2nd place, silver medalist(s)	Arkadiusz Skrzypinski	Poland	1:21:24
3rd place, bronze medalist(s)	Joël Jeannot	France	1:22:23
4	Brian Mitchell	United States	1:30:34
5	Fernando Rocha	Brazil	1:32:42

=== Handcycle women ===
Position	Athlete	Nationality	Time
1st place, gold medalist(s)	Helene Hines	United States	2:02:16
2nd place, silver medalist(s)	Minda Dentler	United States	2:09:28
3rd place, bronze medalist(s)	Jacqui Kapinowski	United States	2:14:04
4	Margaret Sprouse	United States	2:22:29
5	Beth Sanden	United States	3:31:39
