= Duke Ellington Memorial =

Memorial in Manhattan, New York

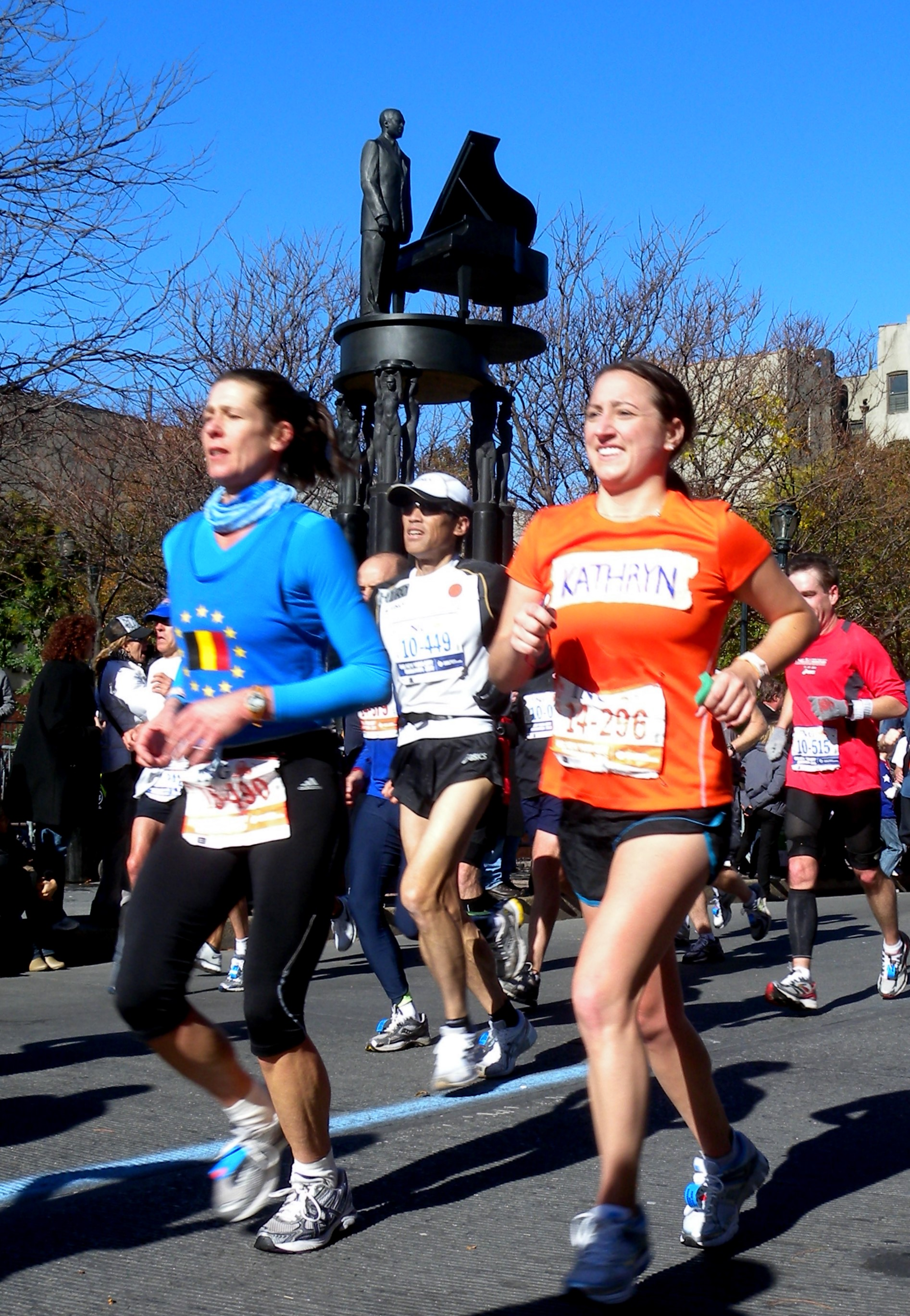
- 2010 New York City Marathon runners pass through the circle with the Duke Ellington Memorial in the background
- Location: New York City, New York, U.S.; 40°47′48.9″N 73°56′57.7″W

The Duke Ellington Memorial by Robert Graham is installed at Duke Ellington Circle in Manhattan, New York City, New York. The monument depicts Duke Ellington at a piano, supported by three columns depicting three caryatids each, known as his nine muses. It was cast in 1997 and dedicated on July 1 of that year. Pianist Bobby Short conceived of the memorial in 1979; it was the first statue erected in Ellington's honor in the United States.
