= Morningside Heights =

Neighborhood in New York City

- Neighborhood of Manhattan
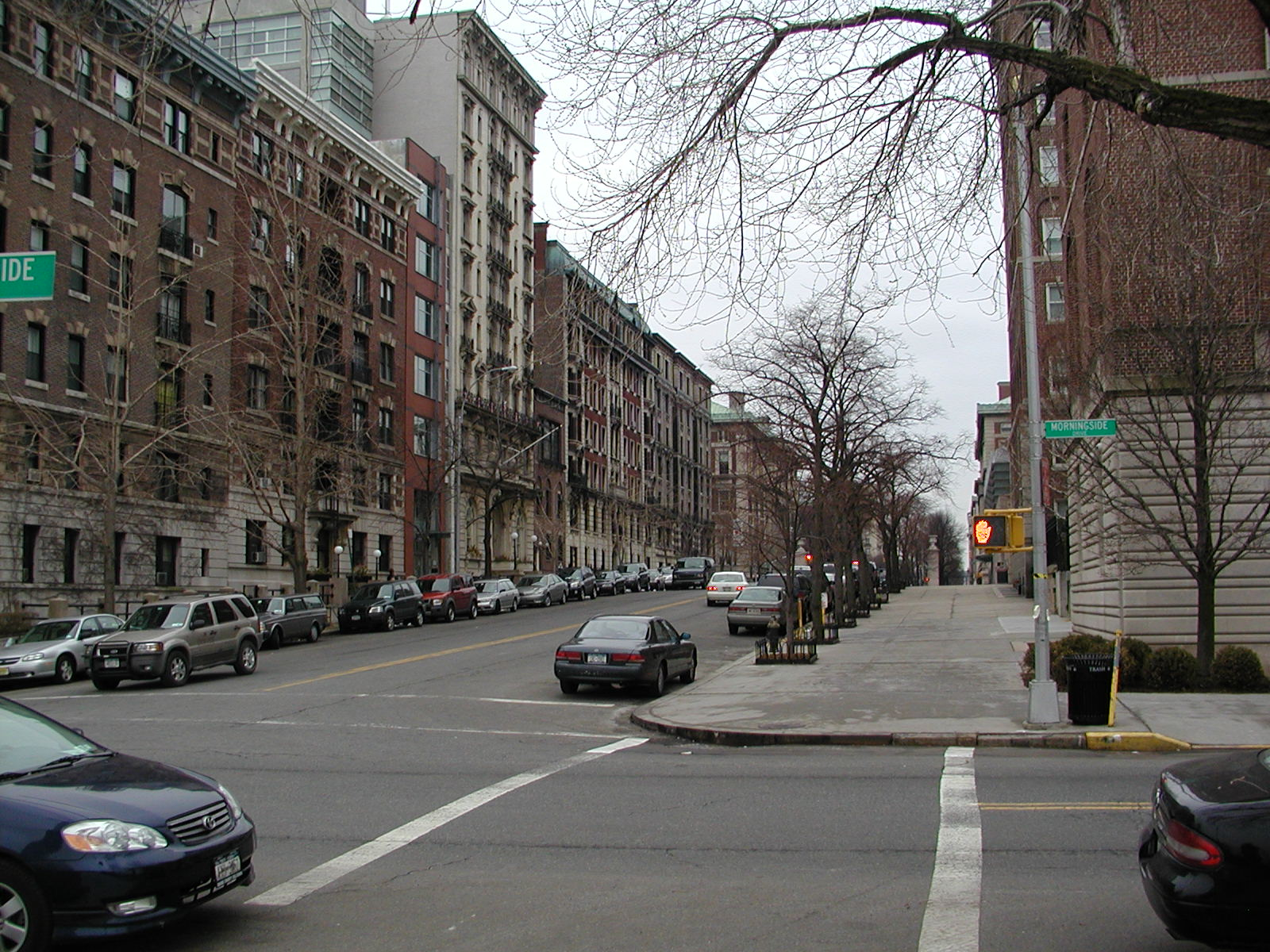
- Residential buildings on West 116th Street opposite Columbia University
- Location in New York City
- Coordinates: 40°48′35″N 73°57′37″W
- Country: United States
- State: New York
- City: New York City
- Borough: Manhattan
- Community District: Manhattan 9

Area
  - Total: 0.472 sq mi (1.22 km^{2})

Population (2016)
  - Total: 31,884
  - Density: 67,600/sq mi (26,100/km^{2})

Ethnicity
  - White: 46.0%
  - Hispanic: 23.5
  - Black: 13.6
  - Asian: 13.3
  - Others: 3.6

Economics
  - Median income: $81,890
- Time zone: UTC−5 (Eastern)
  - Summer (DST): UTC−4 (EDT)
- ZIP Codes: 10025, 10027
- Area code: 212, 332, 646, and 917

Morningside Heights is a neighborhood on the West Side of Upper Manhattan in New York City. It is bound by Morningside Drive to the east, 125th Street to the north, 110th Street to the south, and Riverside Drive to the west. Morningside Heights borders Central Harlem and Morningside Park to the east, Manhattanville to the north, the Manhattan Valley section of the Upper West Side to the south, and Riverside Park to the west. Broadway is the neighborhood's main thoroughfare, running north–south.

Morningside Heights, located on a high plateau between Morningside and Riverside Parks, was hard to access until the late 19th century and was sparsely developed except for the Bloomingdale and Leake and Watts asylums. Morningside Heights and the Upper West Side were considered part of the Bloomingdale District until Morningside Park was finished in the late 19th century. Large-scale development started in the 1890s with academic and cultural institutions. By the 1900s, public transportation construction and the neighborhood's first subway line led to Morningside Heights being developed into a residential neighborhood. Morningside Heights was mostly developed by the 1930s. During the mid-20th century, as the institutions within Morningside Heights expanded, cultural tensions grew between residents who were affiliated with institutions and those who were not. After a period of decline, the neighborhood started to gentrify in the 1980s and 1990s.

A large portion of Morningside Heights is part of the campus of Columbia University, a private Ivy League university. Morningside Heights contains numerous other educational institutions such as Teachers College, Barnard College, the Manhattan School of Music, Bank Street College of Education, Union Theological Seminary, and the Jewish Theological Seminary of America. Additionally, Morningside Heights includes several religious institutions, including the Cathedral of St. John the Divine, Riverside Church, the Church of Notre Dame, Corpus Christi Church, and Interchurch Center. The neighborhood also contains other architectural landmarks, such as St. Luke's Hospital (now Mount Sinai Morningside) and Grant's Tomb.

Morningside Heights is part of Manhattan Community District 9. It is patrolled by the 26th Precinct of the New York City Police Department with fire services being provided by the New York City Fire Department's Engine Company 47 and Engine Company 37/Ladder Company 40. Politically it is represented by the New York City Council's 7th District.

== History ==
=== Precolonial and colonial period ===
Initially, Manhattan was settled by the Lenape Native Americans, who referred to the area nearby as "Muscota" or "Muscoota", meaning "place of rushes". The nearest Native American settlements were Rechewanis and Konaande Kongh in present-day Central Park, to the southeast of modern Morningside Heights. Additionally, a Native American path in the area was adapted into part of modern-day Riverside Drive. However, the region remained relatively hard to access because of the steep topography. Prior to the beginning of the 18th century, most travel within modern New York City was made via water, since there were few roads in the region.

Dutch settlers occupied Manhattan in the early 17th century and called the nearby area "Vredendal", meaning "peaceful dale". The western boundary of New Harlem was drawn through the present-day Morningside Park in 1666, running from 74th Street at the East River to 124th Street at the North River (now Hudson River) on the neighborhood's western edge. The area to the west of the boundary, present-day Morningside Heights, was originally the common lands of New York under English and later British rule. In 1686, New York colonial governor Thomas Dongan granted the city of New York the patent to a triangular area between West 107th to 124th Streets, extending west to the Hudson River. The city sold the land to Jacob De Key in 1701. An easy connection to the rest of the modern-day city was made two years later, when Bloomingdale Road (Note: The name may have come from a Dutch village in a flower-growing region near Haarlem in the Netherlands.) (modern-day Broadway) was extended north from Lower Manhattan to 117th Street. Harman Vandewater acquired part of the De Key farm by 1735, and it was called Vandewater Heights by 1738.

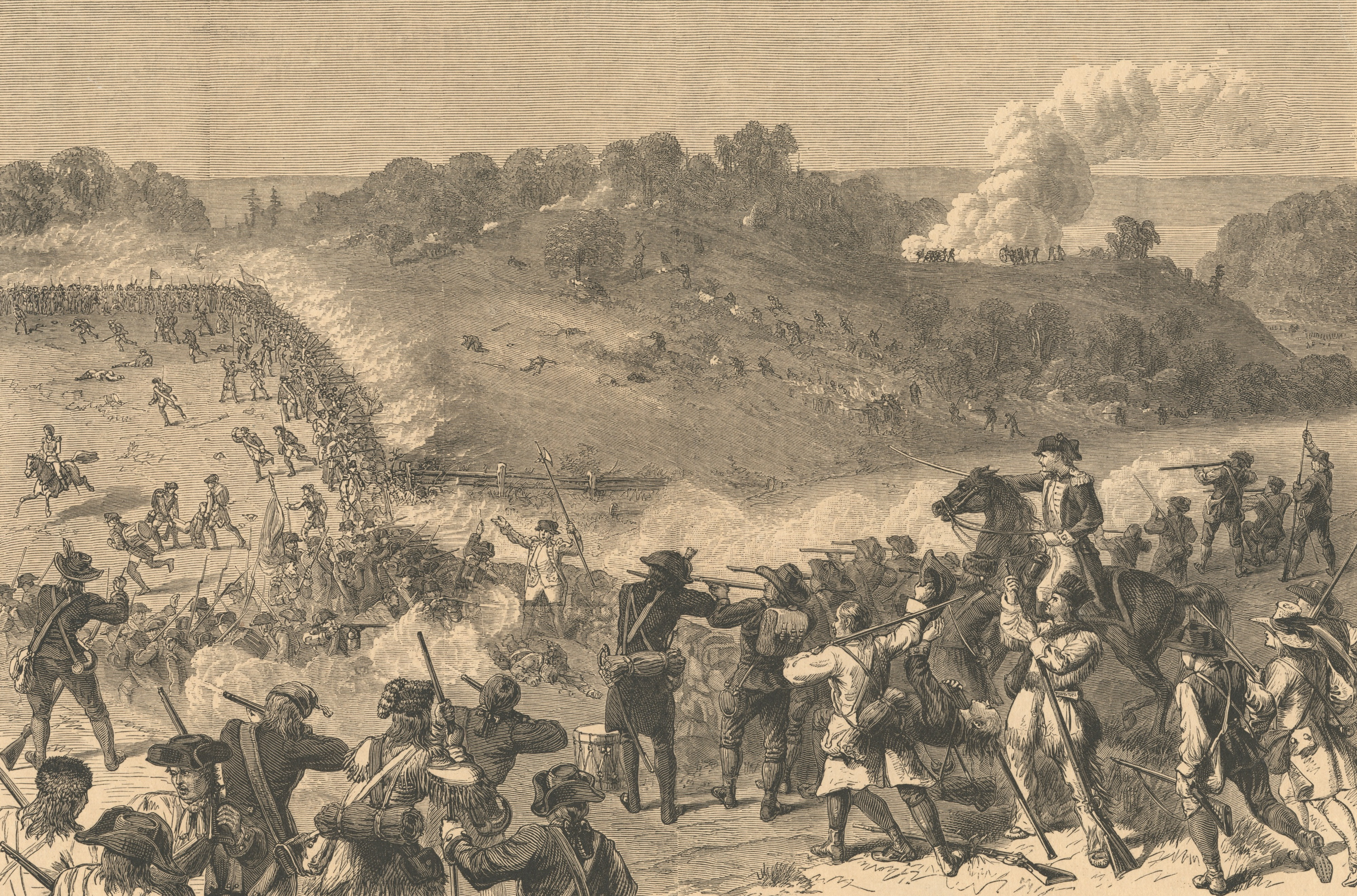
The Battle of Harlem Heights

On September 16, 1776, the Battle of Harlem Heights was fought in the area, with the most intense fighting occurring in a sloping wheat field that is now the location of Barnard College. A plaque by the Columbia University gate on 117th Street and Broadway commemorates this battle. Vandewater Heights was sold by 1785 to James W. De Peyster. His brother, Nicholas De Peyster, bought the land directly to the west, along the shoreline.

=== 19th-century development ===
Though a grid for Manhattan Island would be laid out in the Commissioners' Plan of 1811, the present-day Morningside Heights would remain sparsely developed for the next half-century, with the exception of the Bloomingdale Insane Asylum and the Leake and Watts Orphan Asylum. The Society for New York Hospital had started buying lots between Broadway and Amsterdam Avenues north of 113th Street in 1816, and opened the Bloomingdale Insane Asylum in 1821. Leake and Watts Services purchased the Society's land east of Amsterdam Avenue between 110th and 113th Streets in 1834, and Ithiel Town's design for the Leake and Watts Asylum was completed in 1843. In addition, the Croton Aqueduct ran above ground through the modern neighborhood, opening in 1842.

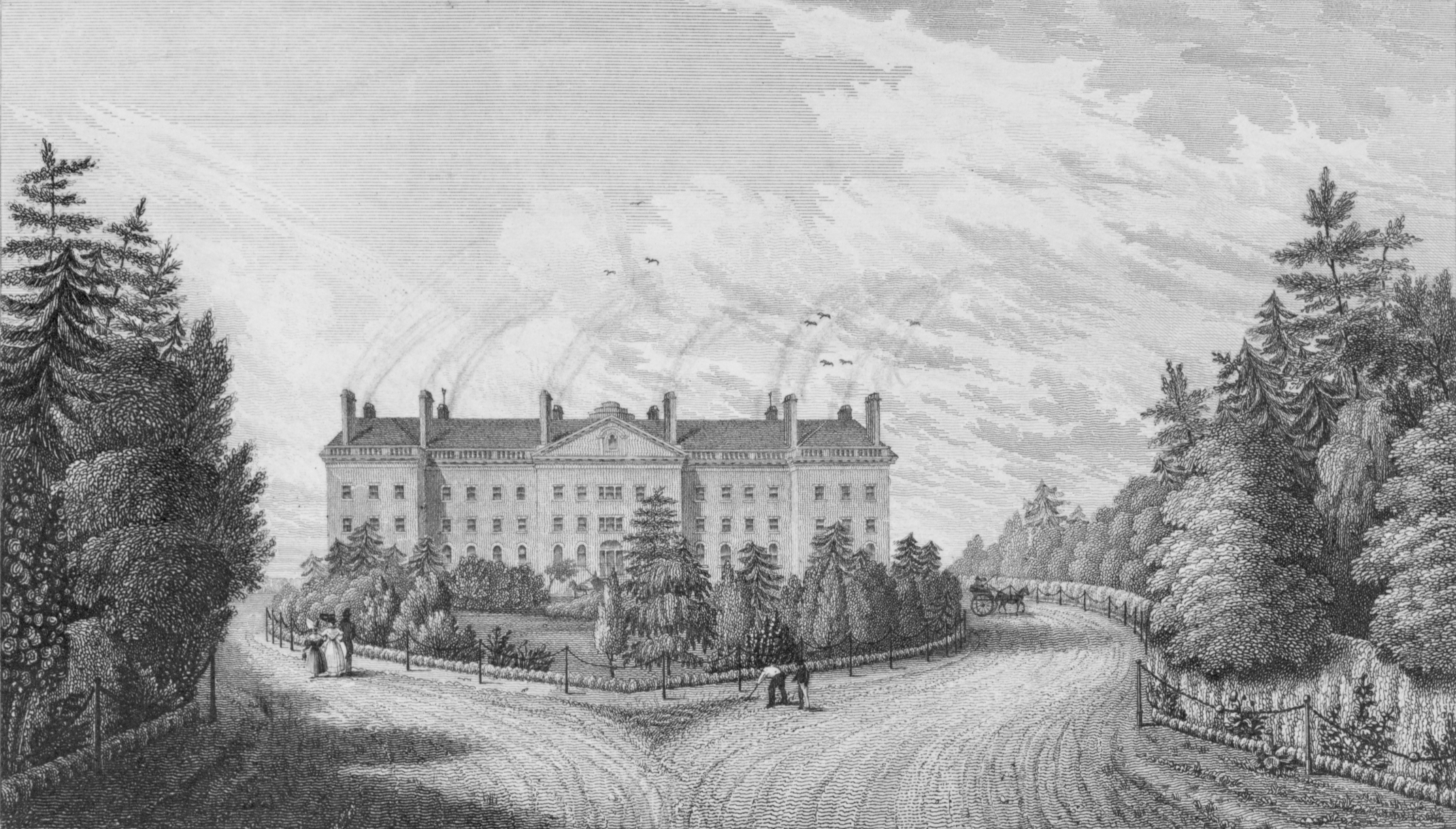
Bloomingdale Insane Asylum, c. 1831

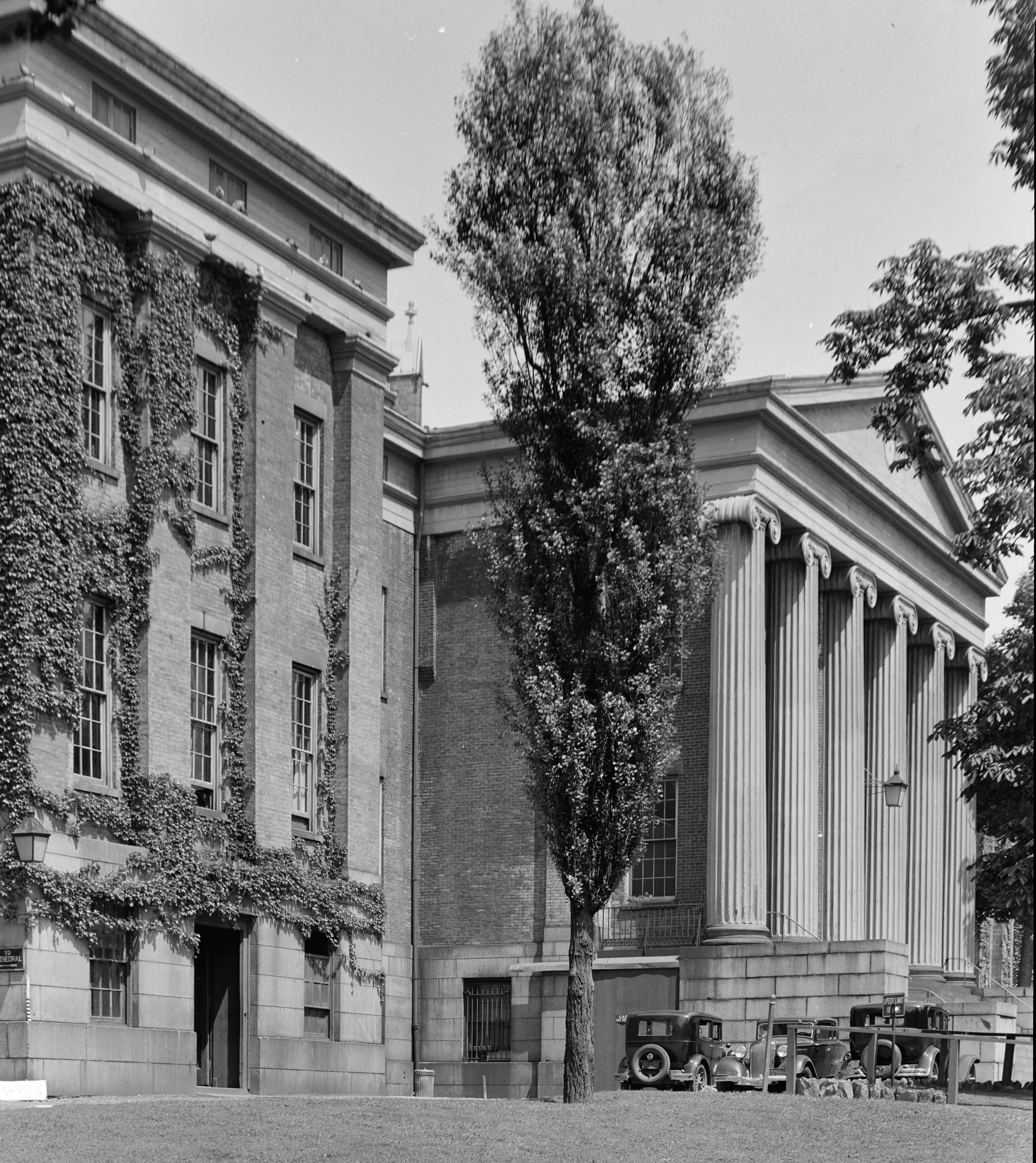
Old Leake and Watts Orphanage, Amsterdam Avenue and 110th Street, in 1934

Through the late 19th century, Bloomingdale Road was the only connection to the rest of Manhattan. A stagecoach line along Bloomingdale Road, founded in 1819, was expanded to modern Morningside Heights and Manhattanville four years later. Mansions were developed on the shore, and William Dixon erected small wood-frame houses on 110th Street, which would be referred to as "Dixonville". In 1846, the Hudson River Railroad (later the West Side Line and Hudson Line) was built along the Hudson River waterfront, connecting New York City to Albany.

By an act of the New York State Legislature passed in 1865, the commissioners of Central Park had the responsibility of executing the Commissioners' Plan of 1811 within Upper Manhattan. The same year, Central Park commissioner William R. Martin put forth the first proposal for a park and scenic road along the Hudson River, which later became Riverside Park and Riverside Drive. On the opposite side of the modern-day neighborhood, to the east, Central Park commissioner Andrew Haswell Green proposed Morningside Park in 1867 to avoid the expense of expanding the Manhattan street grid across extremely steep terrain. Landscape designer Frederick Law Olmsted was hired for both projects: he designed Riverside Drive and Park in 1873–1875, and he co-designed Morningside Park with landscape designer Calvert Vaux in 1873, with further revisions to the latter in 1887. The section of Riverside Drive and Park in the Bloomingdale District, of which modern-day Morningside Heights was considered to be part, was completed by 1880. Morningside Park was completed in 1895.

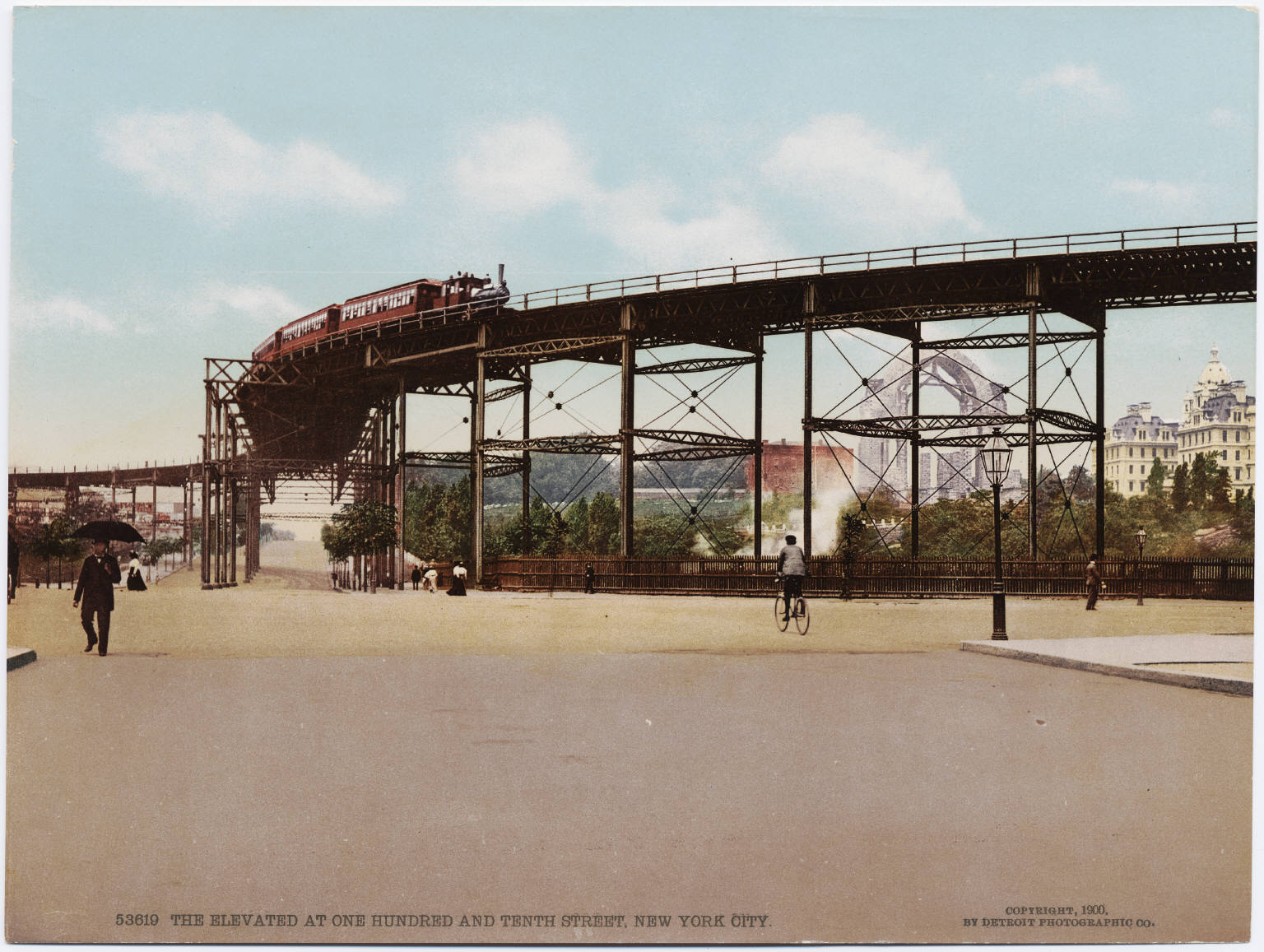
Until 1903, the Ninth Avenue elevated bypassed Morningside Heights (depicted in background).

Though several other infrastructure improvements were made, development in the region above 110th Street was slow until the 1890s. Broadway, a wide avenue with medians, opened in 1868 as the "Boulevard" and replaced the former Bloomingdale Road. New pipes for the Croton Aqueduct were laid in 1865, and a still-extant gatehouse at 113th Street was erected later. Plans to relocate the Bloomingdale Asylum were considered as early as 1870, but the Panic of 1873 financial crisis stalled any additional planning for the rest of the decade. The Ninth Avenue elevated was extended north from the Bloomingdale District to Harlem in 1879, but its route largely skipped the highlands north of 110th Street, as its route shifted eastward at 110th Street. An elevated station at 110th Street and Manhattan Avenue was not opened until 1903, and even then, it was hard to access due to the steep topography. Thus, while the Upper West Side to the south and Hamilton Heights to the north were developed with row houses by the 1880s, the intervening area had almost no new development. The Real Estate Record and Guide stated that it was "difficult to explore the region without a guide" because of the lack of development there.

=== 1890s through 1930s ===
In 1886, real estate figures and politicians started advocating for the relocation of both asylums in the neighborhood. The asylums were seen as holding up development in the area. The Bloomingdale Asylum had twice rejected offers to purchase its land: first in 1880, when Ulysses S. Grant advocated for a world's fair to be held there three years later, and then in 1888, when the area was being considered as the site of the World's Columbian Exposition to be held during 1892.

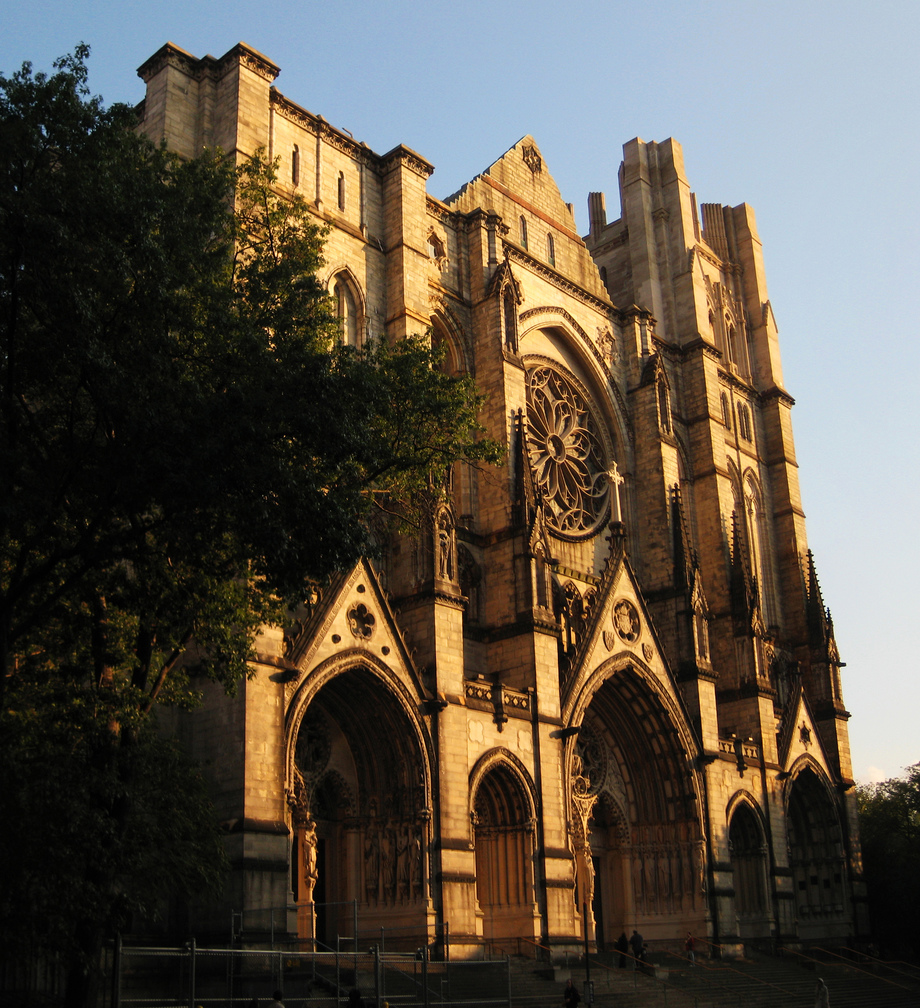
The Cathedral of Saint John the Divine, New York City, opened in 1911.

The Bloomingdale Asylum moved to a site in suburban Westchester County in 1888, followed by the Leake and Watts Asylum three years later. Their respective campuses were purchased by Columbia University, which could not expand their existing campus at the present site of Rockefeller Center in Midtown Manhattan; and the Episcopal Diocese of New York, which had been looking for sites to build their main cathedral, the Cathedral of St. John the Divine. Several other educational institutions were soon constructed in the area, including Barnard College, Teachers College, the Jewish Theological Seminary of America, and Union Theological Seminary. Medical institutions moved there as well, such as St. Luke's Hospital and the Woman's Hospital.

==== New name and first residential buildings ====
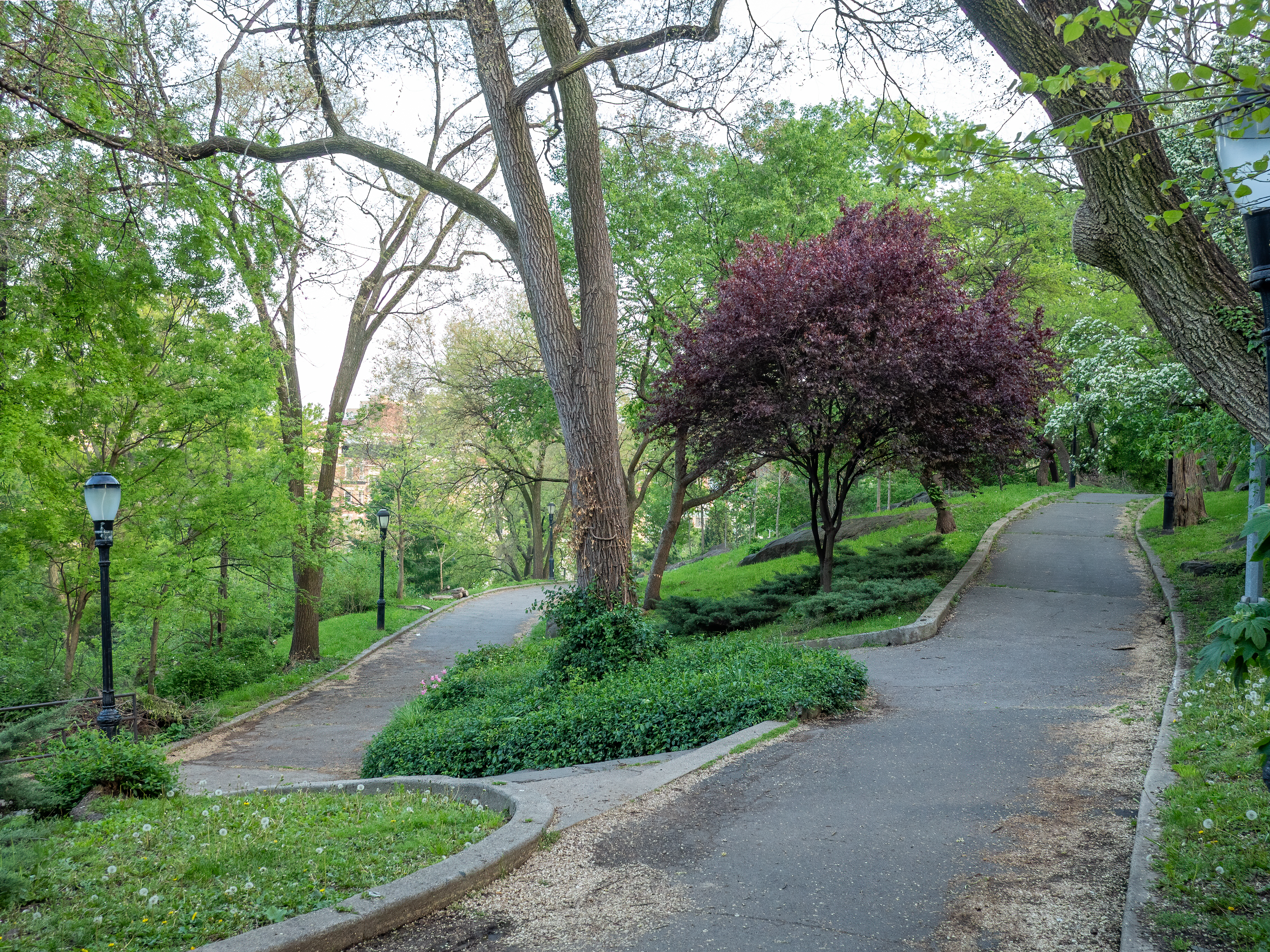
Morningside Park, which was the neighborhood's namesake

In the 1890s, following Morningside Park's completion, several figures began advocating for the use of the name "Morningside Heights" for the region between 110th and 125th Streets. The name "Bloomingdale" was also used for the area around the Bloomingdale Insane Asylum. However, other names such as "Morningside Hill" and "Riverside Heights" were used for the area. When construction started on Columbia University, Teachers College, the Cathedral of St. John the Divine, and St. Luke's Hospital in the mid-1890s, no single name was commonly used for the neighborhood. Two names eventually gained the most use; "Morningside Heights" was preferred by the two colleges, while "Cathedral Heights" was preferred by St. John's and St. Luke's. After about 1898, "Morningside Heights" became the most generally accepted, although the diocese at St. John's continued to call the neighborhood "Cathedral Heights" well into the 20th century.

Additionally, Manhattan's population was growing rapidly, exceeding one million in 1890. Speculative developers, hoping to cater to Morningside Heights' institutions and Manhattan's increasing population, started erecting the first row houses in the area in 1892–1893. These early buildings were designed in the Colonial, Georgian, or Renaissance Revival styles, in contrast to the architecture of the older row houses in nearby neighborhoods. These developers saw mixed success: while some houses sold quickly, others languished for a decade or were foreclosed. The Morningside Protective Association, established in 1896, unsuccessfully attempted to limit the proliferation of low-rise development. The first tenements in Morningside Heights were built toward the end of the 1890s and were among the only Old Law Tenements built in the neighborhood.

==== Academic Acropolis development ====
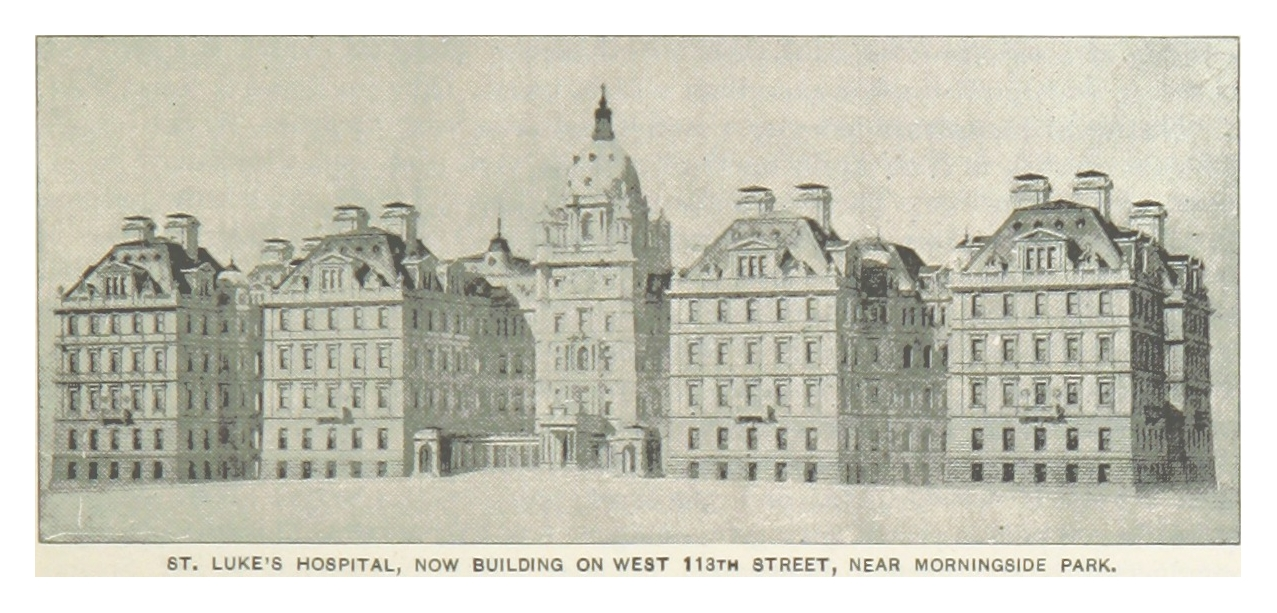
St. Luke's Hospital under construction at 113th Street.

The Cathedral of St. John the Divine, on Amsterdam Avenue between 110th and 113th Streets, had been the first institution to commit to building in Morningside Heights. However, construction proceeded very slowly: the first portion of the cathedral did not open until 1911, and the cathedral remained incomplete a century later. Nonetheless, its presence led other institutions to move to the neighborhood. The first of these was St. Luke's Hospital, which in 1892 purchased the site directly north of the cathedral as a direct result of influence from cathedral secretary George Macculloch Miller. Built to designs by Ernest Flagg, the first five pavilions in the hospital opened in 1896, with three additional pavilions being added later. Next was Cady, Berg & See's Home for Old Men and Aged Couples, built at Amsterdam Avenue and 112th Street and opened in 1896. Third to come was the Woman's Hospital at Amsterdam Avenue and 110th Street, which was designed by Frederick R. Allen of Allen & Collens and completed in 1906. While these projects led to Morningside Heights being known as an "Academic Acropolis", they did not significantly alter the character of the neighborhood.

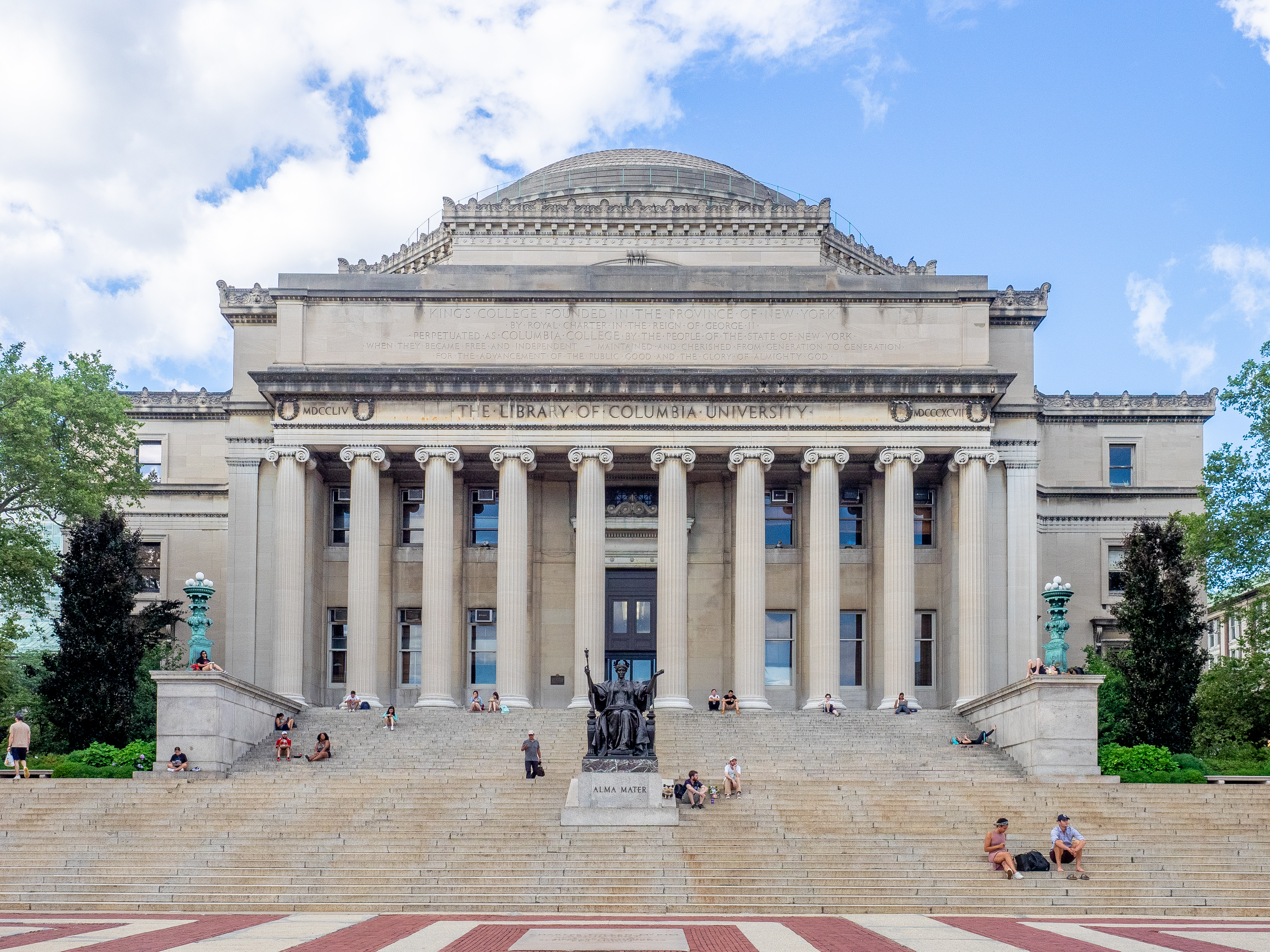
Low Memorial Library of Columbia University

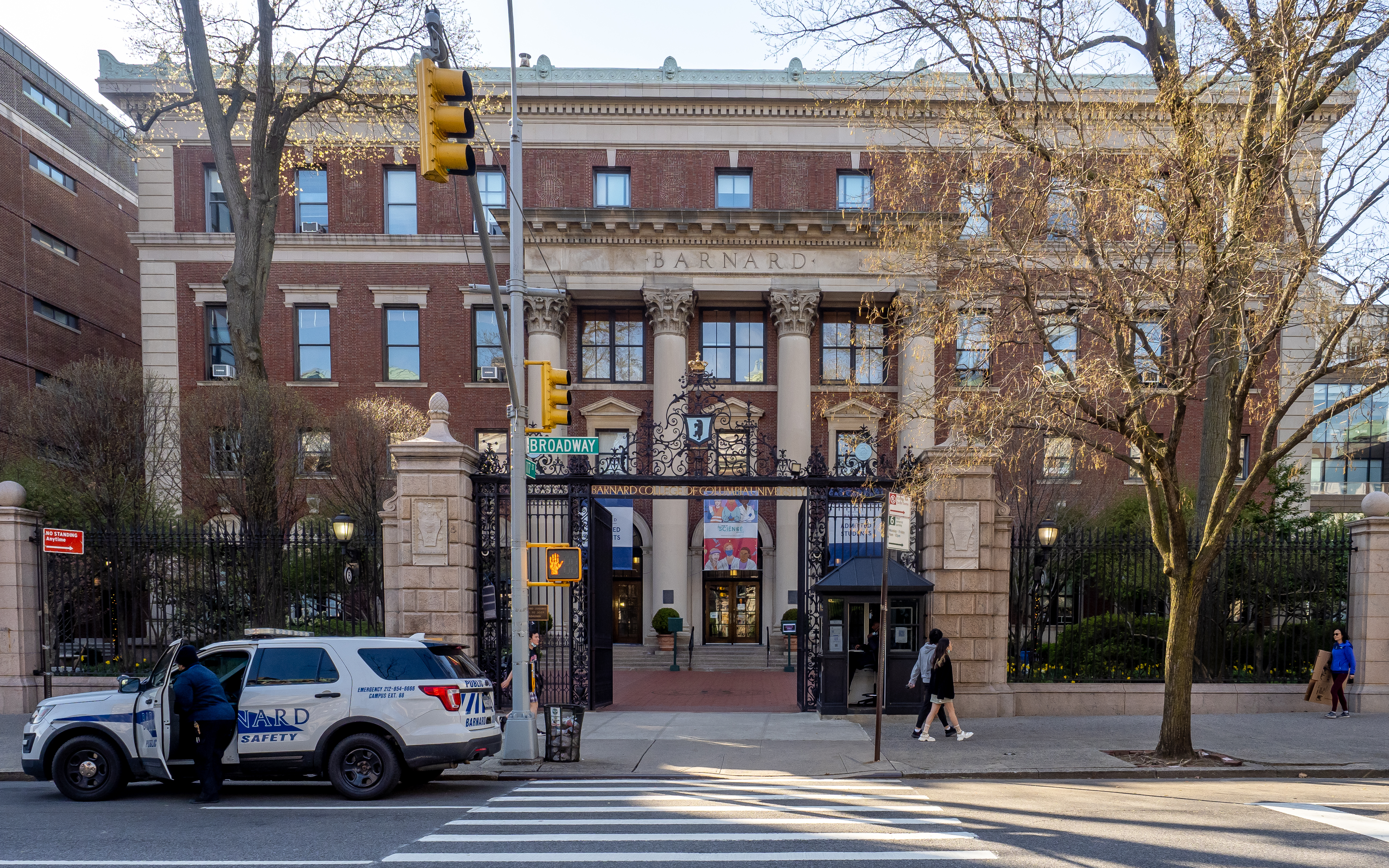
Barnard College of Columbia University main entrance gate

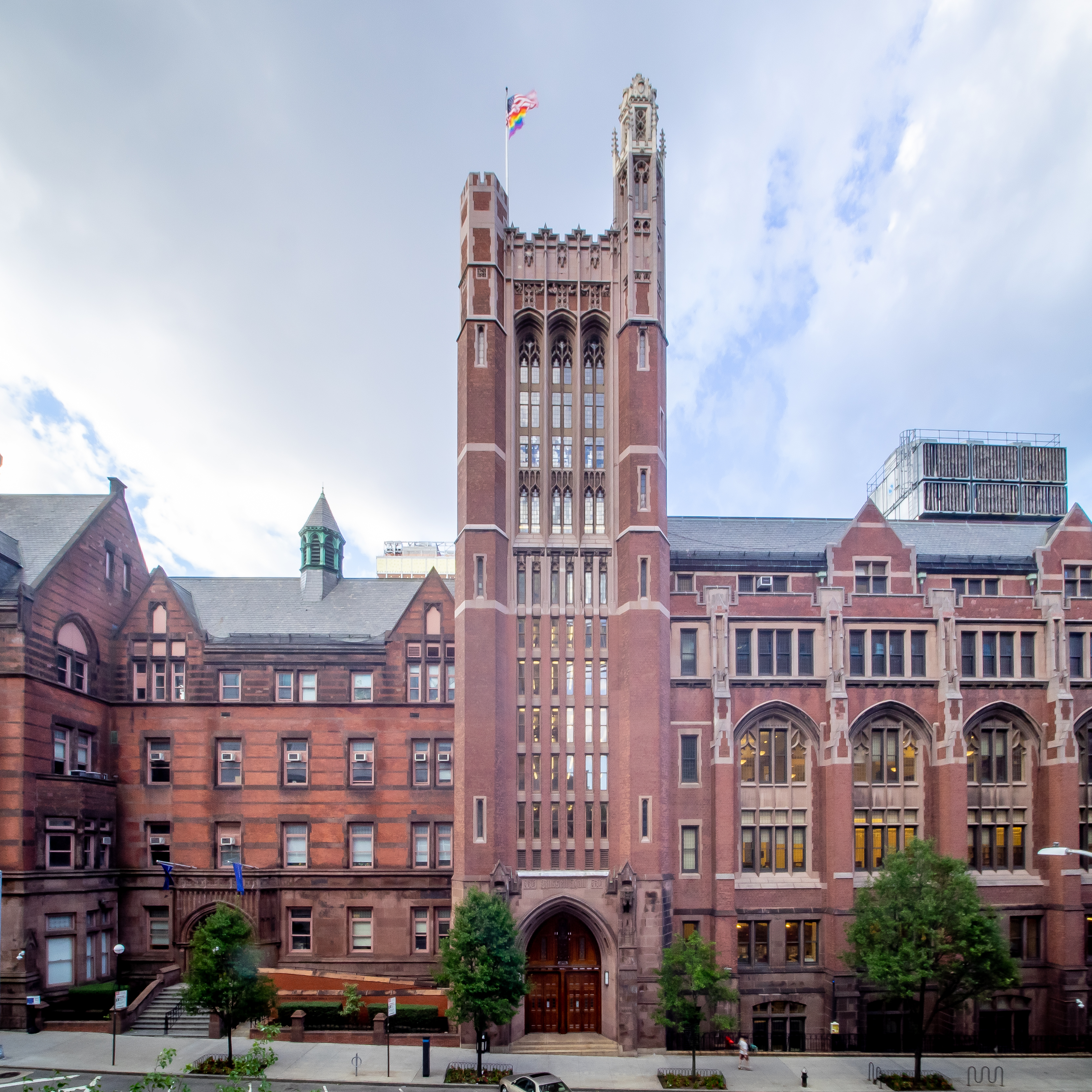
Teachers College's Russell Hall

By the late 1890s and early 1900s, Morningside Heights' academic institutions were growing rapidly. The most prominent of these was Columbia University, whose president Seth Low had commissioned Charles Follen McKim of the architectural firm McKim, Mead & White to design the new Morningside Heights campus in 1893. The plan consisted of 15 buildings and a South Court on the east side of Broadway between 116th and 120th Streets, centered around the university's major library, Low Memorial Library. The Low Library was constructed between 1895 and 1897, along with most of the other original structures, and the first classes at the new campus were held in October 1897. Several campus expansions occurred shortly afterward, including Earl Hall in 1902; the first dormitories, Hartley Hall and Livingston Hall, in 1905; South Field, purchased in 1903; St. Paul's Chapel, completed in 1907; and numerous classrooms and other buildings. Columbia's presence in Morningside Heights led to a significant change in the neighborhood's character, and was dubbed by the Real Estate Record and Guide as "the largest single factor ... in promoting private real estate and building activity on the plateau".

Just across Broadway to the west was the campus of Barnard College, a women's college. In 1895, philanthropist Elizabeth Milbank Anderson donated funds on the condition that Charles A. Rich was hired to design the campus. Before funds ran out, Rich ultimately designed the Milbank, Brinckerhoff, and Fiske Halls, which held their first classes in October 1897. Immediately north of Barnard was Teachers College, which became affiliated with Columbia University in 1893 and merged with the latter in 1897. The buildings for this campus were designed by William Appleton Potter. The first structure in the complex, Main Hall, was completed in late 1894; the last, Milbank Memorial Hall, was finished three years later. Both Barnard and Teachers Colleges saw rapid growth in the early 20th century. Only three structures were built for Barnard, resulting in overcrowding; (Note: Namely Brooks Hall (1906–1908), Students' Hall (1916), and Hewitt Hall (1924)) by contrast, numerous large facilities were erected for Teachers College, including a gymnasium, manual arts building, household arts building, and dormitories.

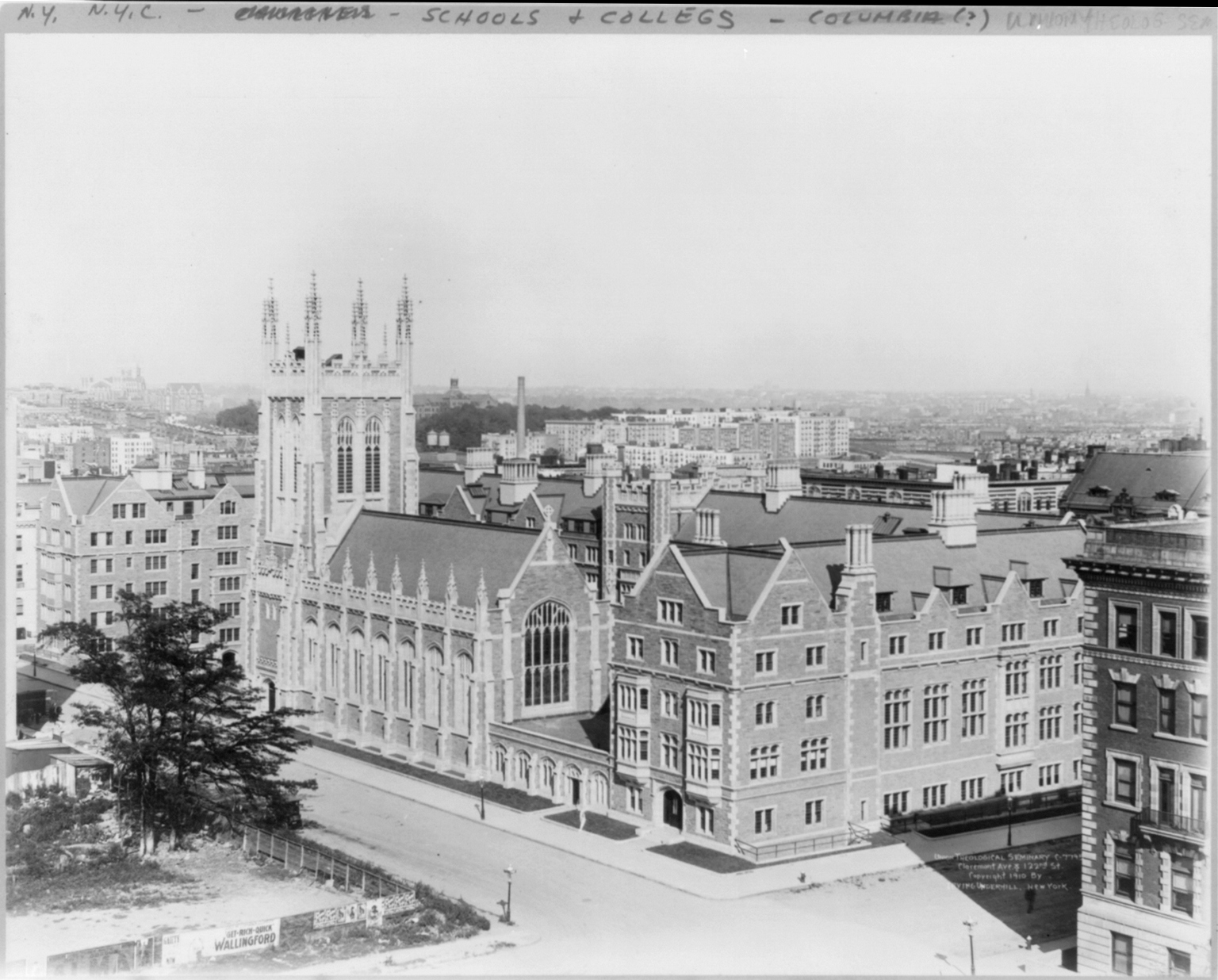
Union Theological Seminary in 1910

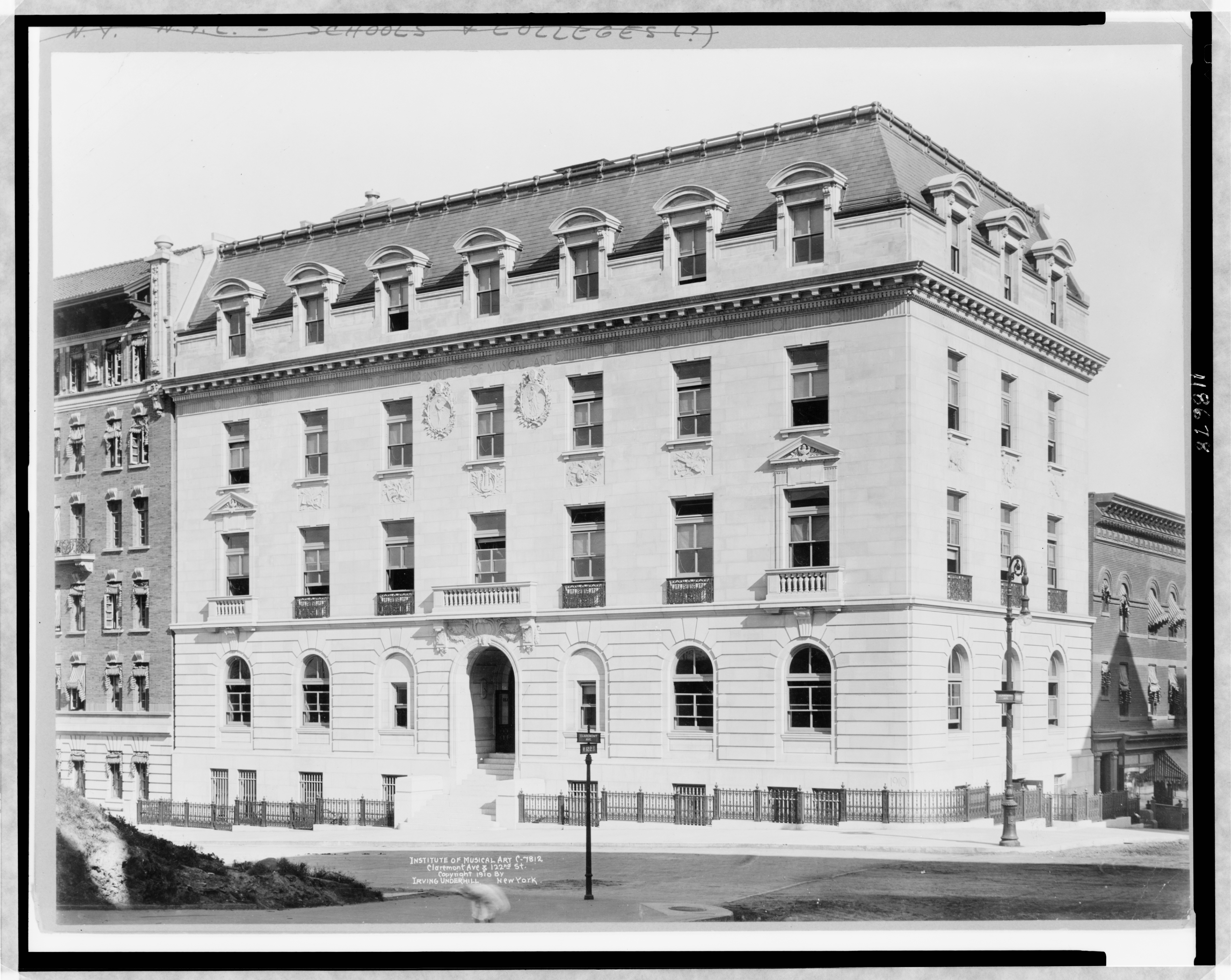
Institute of Musical Art at 120 Claremont Avenue, in 1910

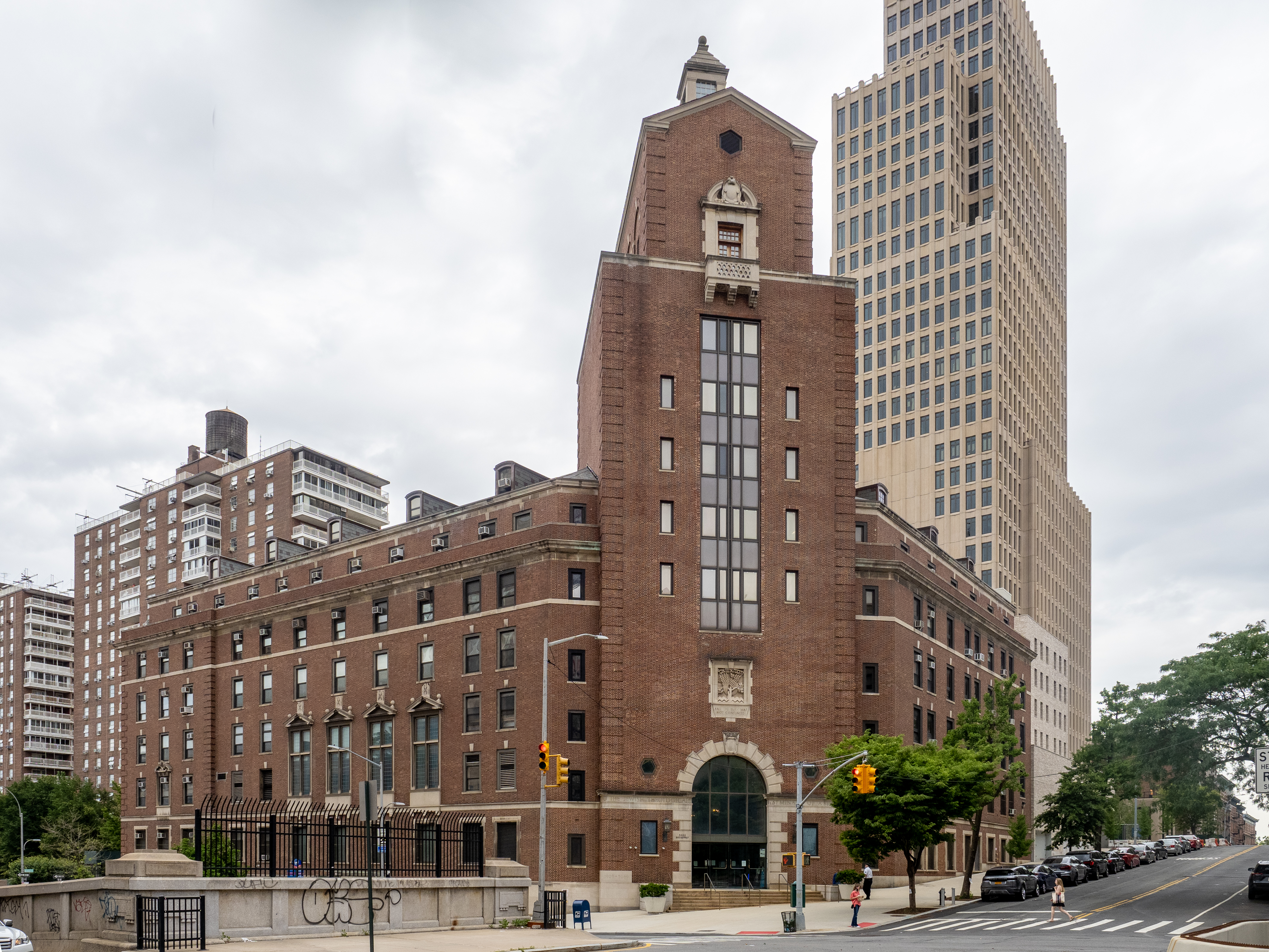
Jewish Theological Seminary of America

Other institutions of higher education on Morningside Heights were developed in the early 20th century, the first of which was the new campus of the Union Theological Seminary between Broadway and Claremont Avenue from 120th to 122nd Streets. The campus was composed of several Gothic Revival structures, designed by architects Allen & Collens and arranged around a quadrangle. The structures were completed by 1910, and expanded soon after with the construction of the Stone Gym in 1912 (now part of Riverside Church), and a dormitory on Claremont Avenue erected in 1931–1932.

Two musical institutions, the Institute of Musical Art and the Juilliard School (which later merged), settled immediately north of the Union Theological Seminary. The Institute of Musical Art constructed its building within 21 weeks in 1910 and had its first classes that same year. The Juilliard building was completed in 1931. The final structure to be built was the Jewish Theological Seminary of America, across Broadway to the east of Juilliard, whose buildings were completed in 1930. Riverside Church, to the west of the Union Theological Seminary, was completed the same year.

==== Apartment developments and subway construction ====
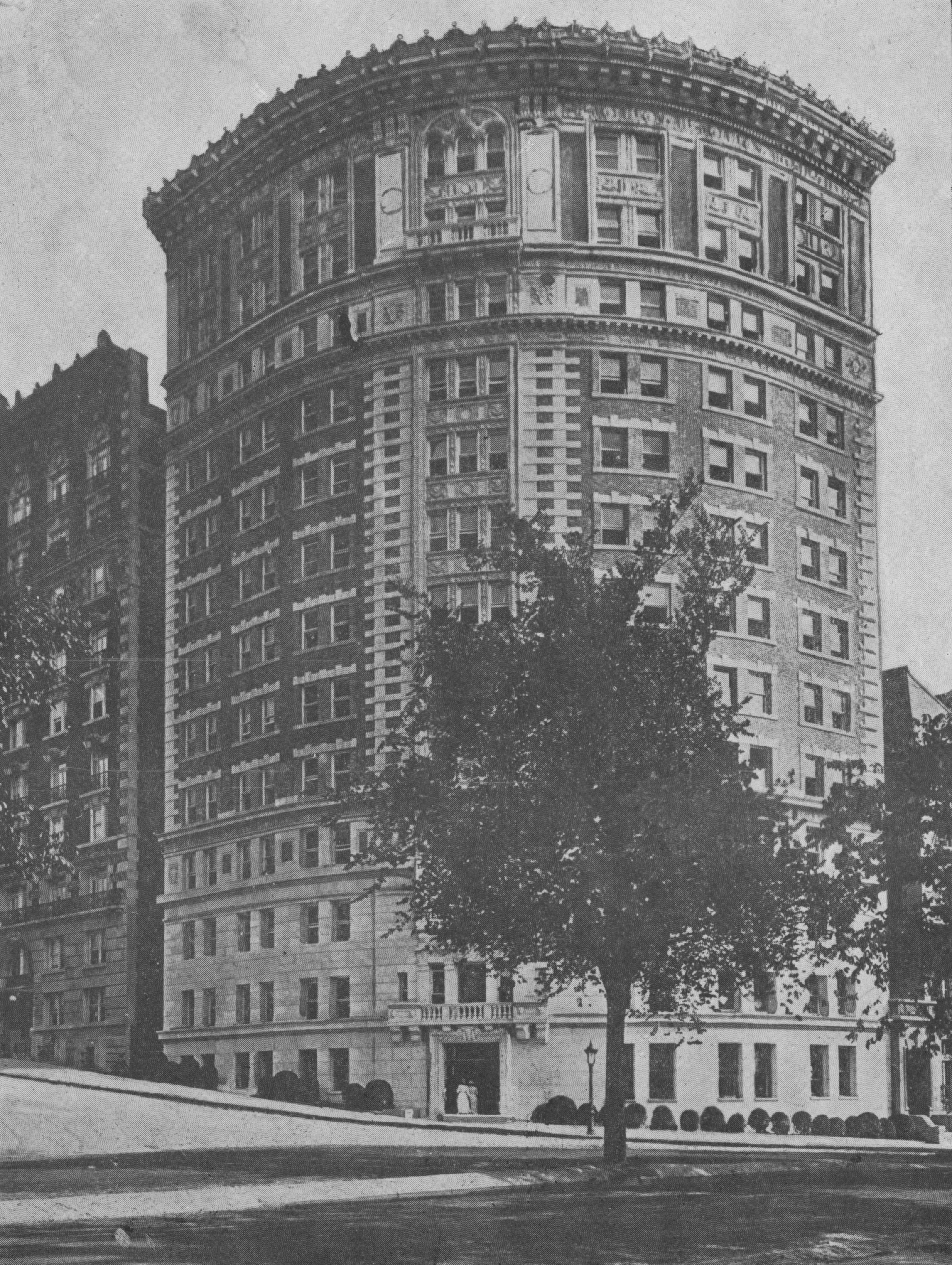
The Colosseum, built by the Paterno Brothers in 1910

There was still little residential development in the first decade of the 20th century. A small concentration of beer gardens began to develop around the "Dixonville" on 110th Street. The New York State Tenement House Act of 1901 drastically changed the regulations to which tenement buildings had to conform. To fit these new regulations, the architects of the different developments drew up several general plans to maximize the amount of floor space in each building, while also ensuring every residential unit had windows that faced either a courtyard or the street. The more common plans included L-, I-, O-, or U-shaped designs. Several buildings were erected close to Broadway in anticipation of the construction of the Interborough Rapid Transit Company's first subway line (now part of the New York City Subway's Broadway–Seventh Avenue Line, serving the 1 train). These buildings contained features that were considered innovative at the time, such as electric lighting, soundproofed and parquet floors, tiled bathrooms with porcelain fixtures, and long-distance telephone lines. Since the character of the neighborhood had not yet been developed, early-1900s apartment buildings tended to be erected "modestly", with little ornamentation.

The subway opened in October 1904 with stations at 110th, 116th, and 125th Streets, providing a direct connection to Lower Manhattan, the city's economic center at the time. In subsequent years, developers erected larger buildings for the middle class, which had been made feasible by the area's proximity to the subway. Between 1903 and 1911, at least 75 apartment buildings were built in the neighborhood. By 1906, there were 27 such developments underway, including structures on which work had started before the 1901 law had been passed. A Real Estate Record and Guide article published in August 1906 described Morningside Heights as New York City's "most distinctive high-class apartment house quarter". Units on Riverside Drive, despite being further from the subway, were generally more expensive because of their riverfront views.

Jewish and Italian developers had a large influence in early-20th century development in Morningside Heights. For instance, the Italian-American Paterno brothers, along with their brothers-in-law, built The Paterno, The Colosseum, and several other large apartment buildings in the area. Two members of the family, Michael Paterno and Victor Cerabone, also started their own firms and built structures in Morningside Heights. The majority of Morningside Heights developers were Jewish, although most of these Jewish developers created only a few buildings. More prolific Jewish developers in Morningside Heights created companies that either carried their family names or had more generic names that hid their family's background. Such developers included Carlyle Realty, B. Crystal & Son, and Carnegie Construction. According to Andrew Dolkart, architectural historian at Columbia University, more than half of the early apartment housing in Morningside Heights was developed by one of three firms: George Pelham, Neville & Bagge, or Schwartz & Gross. After World War I, the remaining empty lots were bought and developed.

By the 1920s, the neighborhood's character had been fully established. In addition to apartment buildings, Morningside Heights contained commercial ventures, though these were mainly confined to low-rise buildings on the north–south avenues. Through the 1930s, many residents were white and middle-class. The heads of these families included professionals like academics, engineers, doctors, lawyers, and businesspersons who worked in industries such as the garment trade.

=== Mid- and late 20th century ===
==== Demographic changes ====
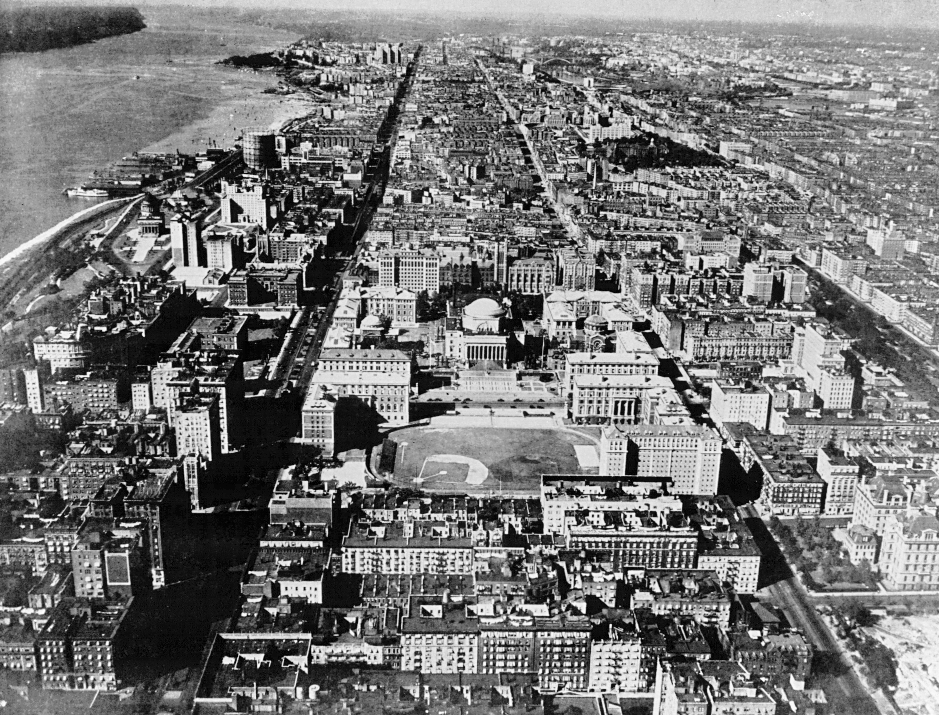
Morningside Heights in 1926

As early as 1930, the neighborhood was undergoing major demographic changes, and the newcomers included middle-class families who were not necessarily part of any institution. This resulted in a split between the two main groups that inhabited Morningside Heights—those who were affiliated with institutions and those who were not—setting up conflicts between the two demographic groups.

As a response to the Great Depression, many of the apartments had been subdivided into smaller units, with residents frequently dividing their apartments or taking in boarders, or owners converting their buildings to single room occupancy (SRO) hotels. The increasing prevalence of SROs led to attendant socioeconomic problems and a decline in the neighborhood, especially after World War II, when many well-off white residents left for the suburbs, to be replaced by poor African American and Puerto Rican residents. Many of the once-opulent apartment buildings declined in quality. In a sign of the social tensions that had developed in Morningside Heights, in 1958, The New York Times reported that midshipmen of the United States Navy studying at Columbia were forbidden from the area bound by Broadway, Amsterdam Avenue, and 110th and 113th Streets, where there were reported to be high concentrations of prostitutes. Two years later, the Times called the formerly opulent Hendrik Hudson apartment building "one of the city's worst slum buildings", with several hundred building and health code violations. By 1961, there were 33 SROs in the neighborhood.

==== Urban renewal ====
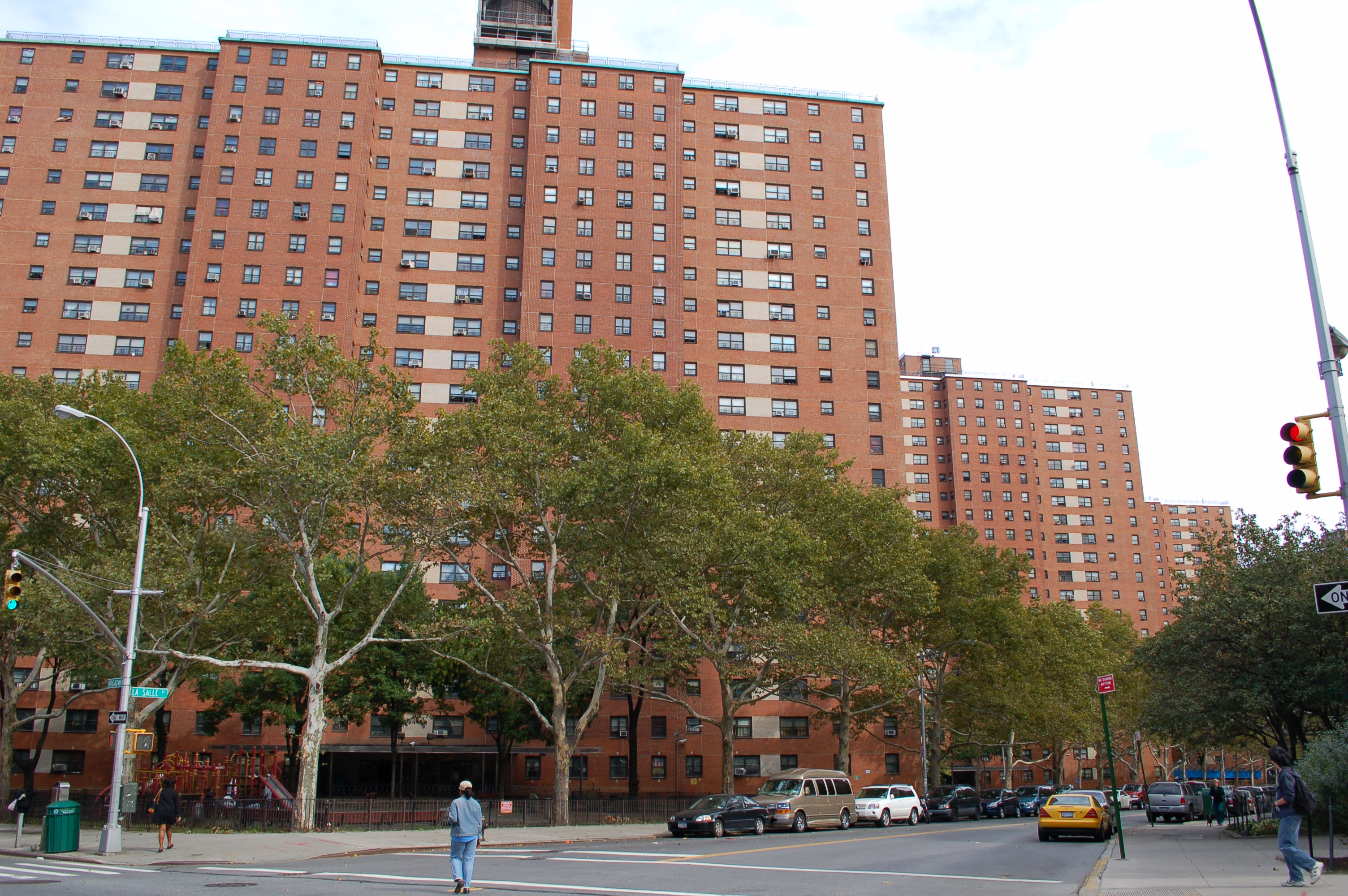
Grant Houses, one of the redevelopment projects in Morningside Heights in the 1950s

In 1947, fourteen major institutions in the neighborhood formed Morningside Heights Inc, an urban renewal organization that aimed to reduce poverty and segregation by erecting new housing. Morningside Heights Inc., headed by David Rockefeller, was the first major joint venture between the neighborhood's institutions. Its first project was Morningside Gardens, a middle-income co-op apartment complex between 123rd and LaSalle Streets, Broadway, and Amsterdam Avenue. The project, completed in 1957, was initially occupied by a multi-racial tenant base of just under a thousand families, a third of whom worked at neighborhood institutions. Morningside Gardens drew some opposition, as it replaced an eclectic group of low- and mid-rise housing that was occupied by about 6,000 people, mostly African Americans.

Another development in the neighborhood was Grant Houses, a New York City Housing Authority public-housing development located to the east of Morningside Gardens, across Amsterdam Avenue. Completed in 1956, it was less successful in racial integration but was praised by local landlords as a deterrent to urban decay. The construction of Grant Houses necessitated the displacement of 7,000 residents.

The New York Times described the urban renewal scheme in 1957 as "the biggest face-lifting job under way in this city". Prior to the urban renewal projects, most institutions in Morningside Heights considered its northern boundary to be around 122nd Street, but with the completion of these developments, the area between 122nd and 125th Street was added to the popular definition of Morningside Heights.

==== Institutional expansion ====
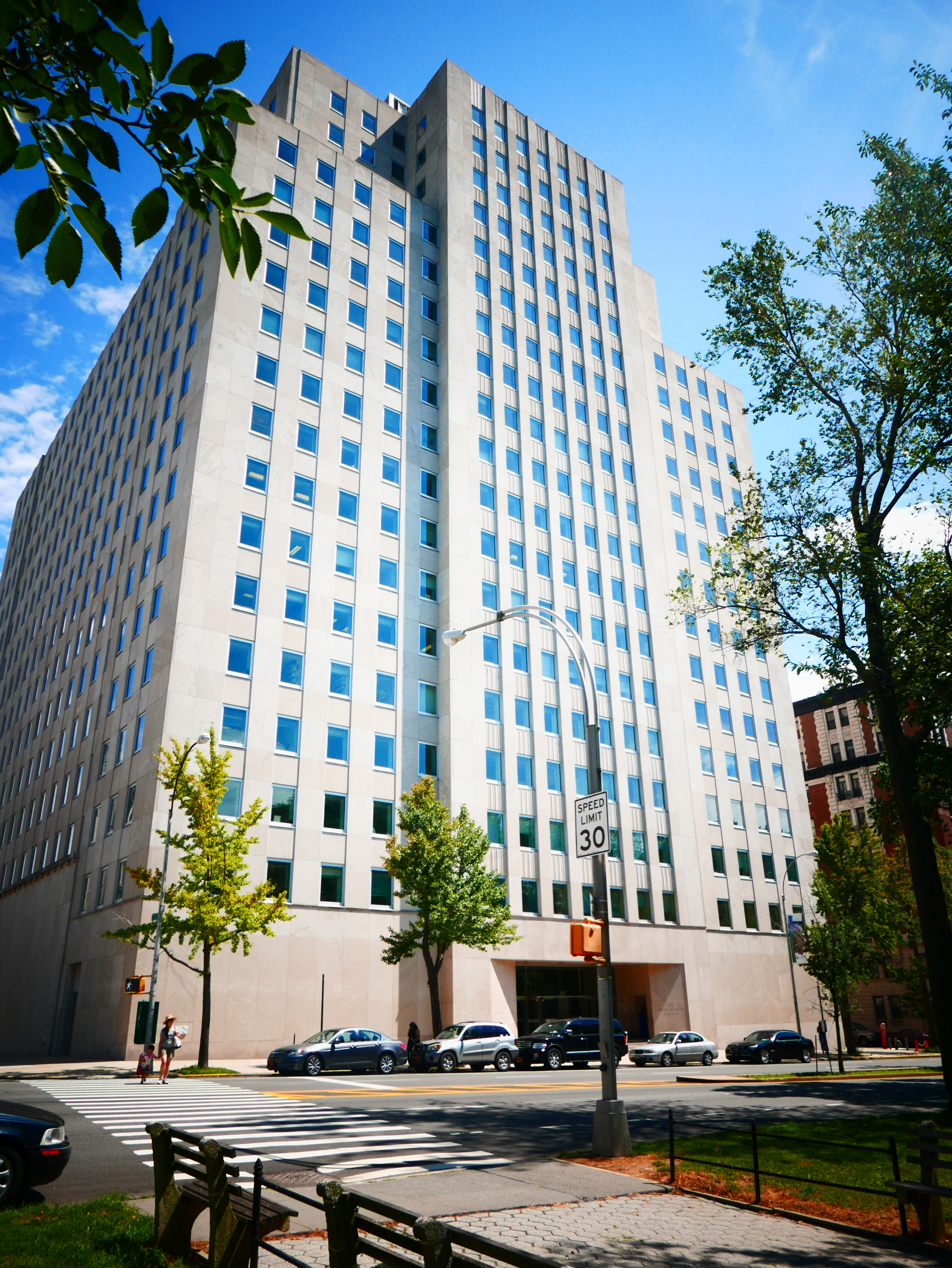
The Interchurch Center

Three institutions opened or moved into Morningside Heights during the late 1950s and early 1960s. These were the Interchurch Center, opened in 1960; the Bank Street College of Education, which announced its intention to move to the area in 1964; and St. Hilda's & St. Hugh's School, which relocated from Manhattan Valley and Morningside Heights in 1967. Columbia University assisted with the latter two additions, since it was interested in making Morningside Heights into a desirable place for its faculty to send their children to primary school. Within the existing campuses of neighborhood institutions, two St. Luke's Hospital pavilions were demolished and replaced in the 1950s and 1960s, and a new office wing at Riverside Church opened in 1959.

Social tensions began to develop as many of the area's institutions began to expand into the surrounding neighborhood. The newer buildings had architecture that was described as bland, as contrasted to the simultaneous expansions of other communities with Ivy League universities, which were constructing structures with more distinctive designs. (Note: Architectural historian Andrew Dolkart cites Harvard University in Cambridge, Massachusetts, and Yale University in New Haven, Connecticut, as examples of Ivy League campuses that were erecting structures with more distinguished architecture.) Through the 1960s, Columbia University, Barnard College, and other institutions purchased several dozen buildings in Morningside Heights, leading to accusations of forced eviction and gentrification. Many residential buildings were converted to institutional use, while others were demolished to make way for new institutional buildings, such as Columbia University's East Campus. The process involved demolishing some of the SROs, which were mostly occupied by racial minorities and did not have rent regulation. Likewise, while apartment buildings were rent-regulated, many units were subject to "affiliation clauses" that extended tenancy only to members of the academic institutions within Morningside Heights. Protests against such clauses continued through the late 1970s.

The conflicts peaked in 1968, when protests arose in Columbia's campus and the surrounding neighborhood over the university's proposal to build a gym in Morningside Park, which would have created separate entrances in mostly-white Morningside Heights and mostly-black Harlem. The university abandoned the plan the next year. Two other major plans were proposed but not built after objections from the community: a proposed expansion of the Interchurch Center, and a nursing home on Amsterdam Avenue between 111th and 112th Streets. There were even disputes between the city and Columbia University: the city had proposed erecting 1,000 apartments on Riverside Drive, but Columbia objected because it would have precluded the university's ability to build a proposed western campus. In 1970, architect I. M. Pei was hired to create a new plan for Columbia's expansion on the South Field, though only one portion of Pei's plan was ever built.

==== 1970s to 1990s ====
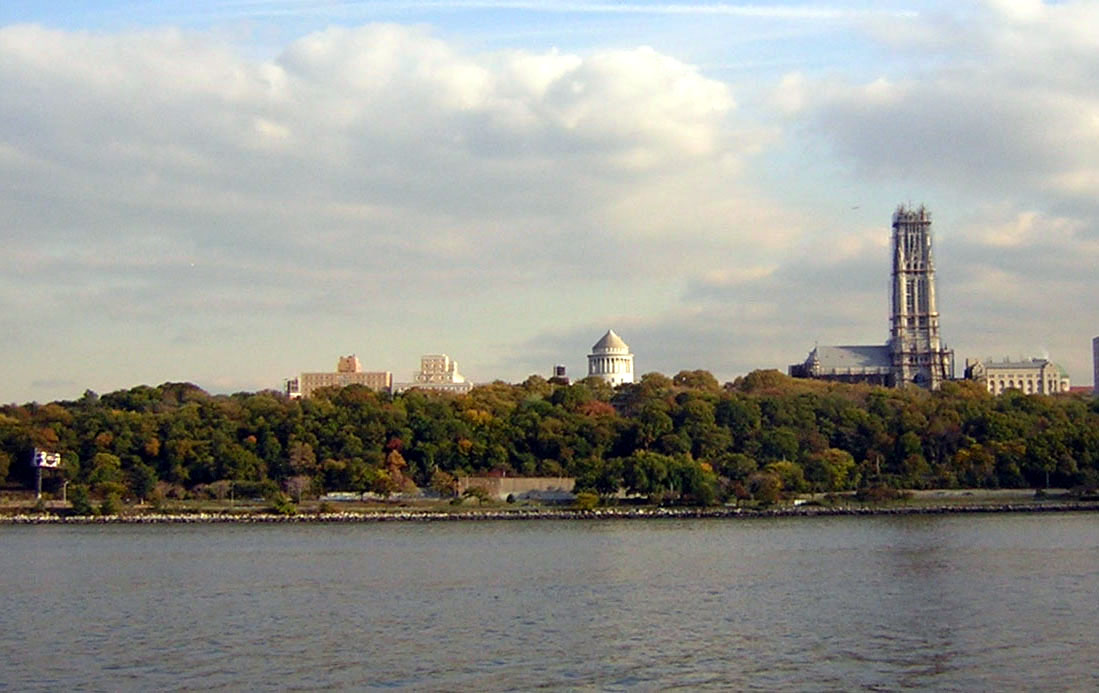
From the Hudson River

In the 1970s, as crime increased in the city in general, institutional leaders in Morningside Heights raised concerns about safety and security. Meanwhile, Columbia University continued to expand its presence in the neighborhood. By the late 1970s, one in five apartment buildings in Morningside Heights were owned by Columbia, and by the 1980s, it was the neighborhood's largest landlord. In 1979, a Barnard College student was killed by masonry that fell from a building owned by Columbia. In the subsequent years, new building codes resulted in the removal of decorative elements on many buildings in the neighborhood.

The residential community of Morningside Heights remained centered around the neighboring institutions, and was relatively safe compared to nearby neighborhoods, though many residents stayed away from Morningside Park. A 1982 New York Times article mentioned that Broadway was seeing many new "restaurants and boutiques" that had replaced "dusty shops and fast-food counters". By 1987, Morningside Heights was much safer compared to 15 years prior, with Broadway being redeveloped as a fashionable shopping district. Much of this effort was undertaken by Columbia, which sought to improve its reputation among the surrounding community.

Columbia started to restore several of its buildings in the 1990s, and it continued to expand into Morningside Heights. By the end of the decade, there were only 50 apartment buildings between 110th and 122nd Streets that were not owned by the university. Other structures were also built in Morningside Heights, including Barnard's Sulzberger Hall. Morningside Park, which received a series of renovations in the 1980s and 1990s, was no longer considered to be as dangerous by the beginning of the 21st century. Despite its redevelopment, the neighborhood still retained some of its working-class character, mostly because of Columbia's affiliation-clause policy, leading the New York Times to say in 1993 that Morningside Heights "has practically escaped yuppification". Housing prices started to increase rapidly in the late 1990s. A 1999 Times article mentioned that though there were still tensions between residents and institutions, these conflicts had subsided somewhat, with institutions being more receptive to feedback from residents.

=== 21st century ===
In the late 1990s, some businesses in the area started labeling Morningside Heights and southern Harlem with the name SoHa (for "South Harlem" or "South of Harlem"), as seen in the names of Max's SoHa restaurant and the former SoHa nightclub in Morningside Heights. "SoHa" became a controversial name, having been used by the real estate industry and other individuals gentrifying the area between West 110th and 125th Streets. One critic called the SoHa name "insulting and another sign of gentrification run amok", while another said that "the rebranding not only places their neighborhood's rich history under erasure but also appears to be intent on attracting new tenants, including students from nearby Columbia University." The controversy led to proposals for legislation that would limit neighborhood rebranding citywide. In June 2017, U.S. Representative Adriano Espaillat, who represents Morningside Heights and Harlem, introduced a resolution in the U.S. Congress that would, as he put it, "keep Harlem Harlem." In the wake of the backlash against the renaming effort, in July 2017 the real estate company that had pushed the rebranding dropped its effort.

By the 2010s, new developments were being built amid several of Morningside Heights' preexisting institutions. For instance, two residential buildings had been erected on the cathedral close of St. John the Divine; part of the old St. Luke's Hospital was being converted into apartments; and the Union and Jewish Theological Seminaries had sold the rights to build apartments on their campuses. However, the neighborhood still retained a reputation for being relatively affordable, with per-foot housing prices being lower than in nearby neighborhoods. In 2017, part of Morningside Heights was protected as part of the Morningside Heights Historic District. Despite advocacy from local residents, the New York City Department of City Planning declined to rezone Morningside Heights in 2019. This prompted residents to create a task force, the Morningside Heights Community Coalition, to rezone certain blocks to require affordable housing in certain types of developments. In 2021, the task force and local politicians announced a proposal to rezone a 15-block portion of Morningside Heights; if implemented, it would be the neighborhood's first rezoning in six decades.

== Demographics ==
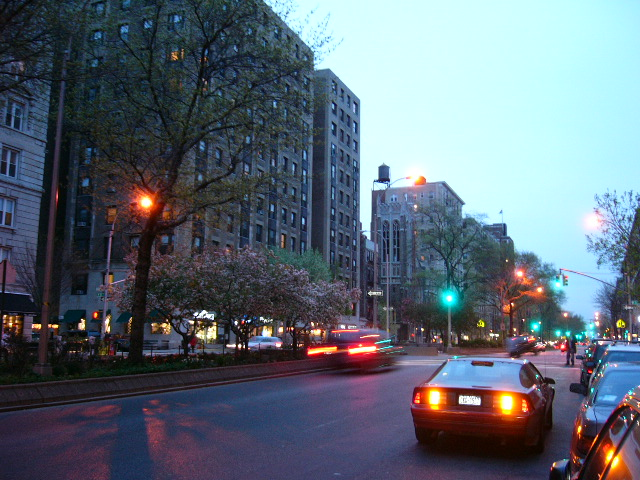
Broadway at dusk

Based on data from the 2010 United States census, the population of Morningside Heights was 55,929, an increase of 1,721 (3.2%) from the 54,208 counted in the 2000 Census. Covering an area of 465.11 acres (188.22 ha), the neighborhood had a population density of 120.2 inhabitants per acre (76,900/sq mi; 29,700/km^{2}). The racial makeup of the neighborhood was 46.0% (25,750) White, 13.6% (7,619) African American, 0.2% (105) Native American, 13.3% (7,462) Asian, 0.1% (30) Pacific Islander, 0.4% (203) from other races, and 2.9% (1,605) from two or more races. Hispanic or Latino people of any race were 23.5% (13,155) of the population.

The population of Morningside Heights changed moderately from 2000 to 2010, with an increase in the Asian population by 27% (1,565), a decrease in the Black population by 16% (1,502), and an increase in the White population by 7% (1,606). The Latino population experienced a slight decrease of 2% (203), while the population of all other races increased by 15% (255) yet remained a small minority.

The entirety of Manhattan Community District 9, which encompasses Morningside Heights, Manhattanville, and Hamilton Heights, had 111,287 inhabitants as of NYC Health's 2018 Community Health Profile, with an average life expectancy of 81.4 years. This is about the same as the median life expectancy of 81.2 for all New York City neighborhoods. Most residents are children and middle-aged adults: 34% are between the ages of 25 and 44, while 21% are between 45 and 64, and 17% are between 0 and 17. The ratio of college-aged and elderly residents was lower, at 16% and 12% respectively.

As of 2017, the median household income in Community District 9 was $50,048, though the median income in Morningside Heights individually was $81,890. In 2018, an estimated 24% of Community District 9 residents lived in poverty, compared to 14% in all of Manhattan and 20% in all of New York City. One in 12 residents (8%) were unemployed, compared to 7% in Manhattan and 9% in New York City. Rent burden, or the percentage of residents who have difficulty paying their rent, was 51% in Community District 9, compared to the boroughwide and citywide rates of 45% and 51% respectively. Based on this calculation, as of 2018, Community District 9 was considered to be gentrifying: according to the Community Health Profile, the district was low-income in 1990 and had seen above-median rent growth up to 2010.

== Land use and terrain ==
Morningside Heights is located in Upper Manhattan, bound by Morningside Park to the east, 125th Street to the north, 110th Street to the south, and Riverside Park to the west. It is sometimes described as part of West Harlem. The neighborhood is zoned primarily for high-rise apartment buildings, though ground-floor stores are also present on Broadway and Amsterdam Avenue. In practice, much of the neighborhood is composed of structures for the neighborhood's religious or academic institutions.

=== Residential stock ===
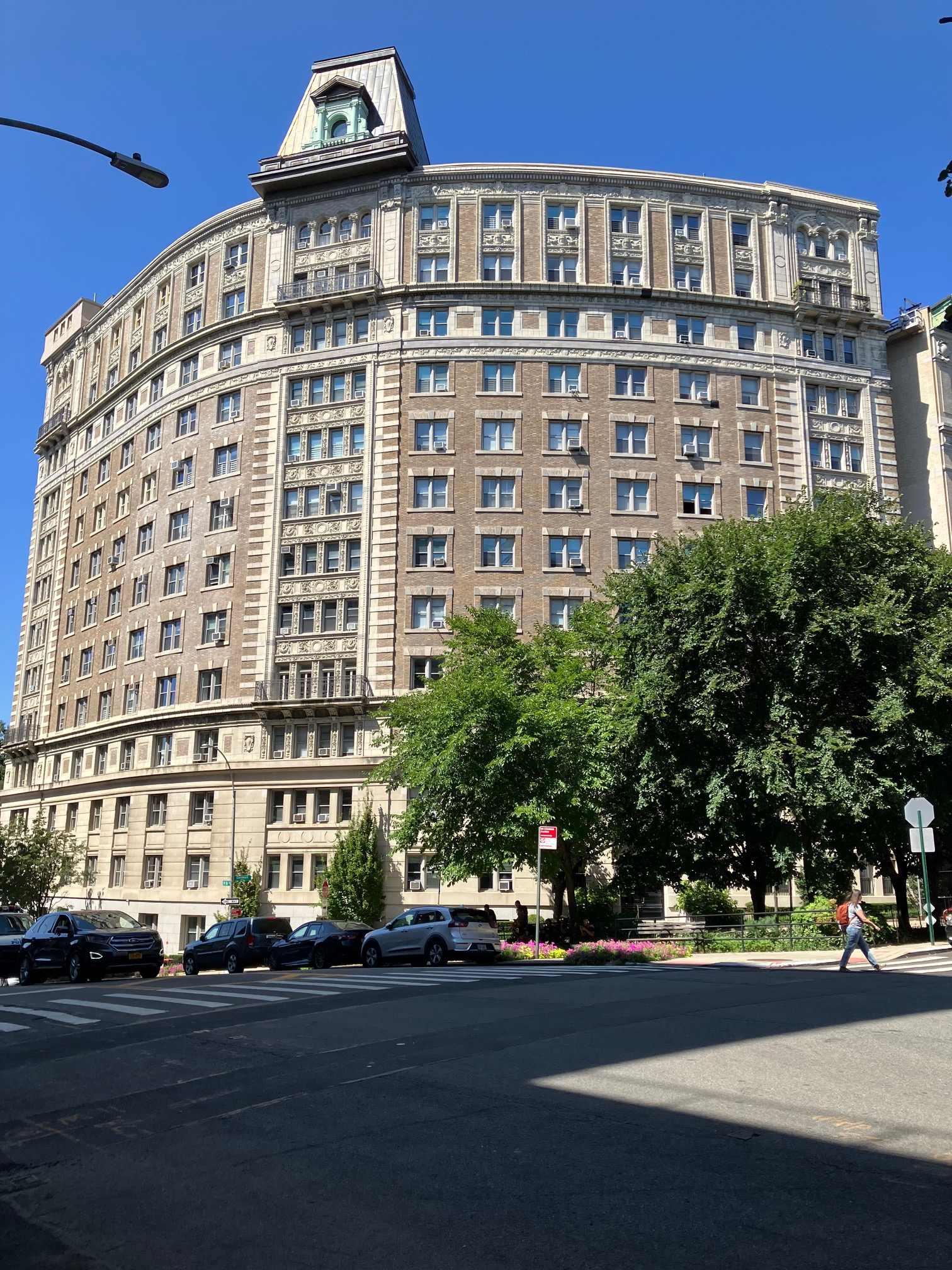
The Paterno

The residential stock of Morningside Heights is composed of apartment buildings, many of which survive from the neighborhood's early-20th century wave of development. While many of the original apartments have been subdivided, numerous original five- to seven-bedroom units remain. Two of the more distinctive apartment structures are The Colosseum and The Paterno, at 116th Street and Riverside Drive, whose curved facades are the only evidence of a never-built large plaza that would have flanked Riverside Drive. Another notable apartment building is The Hendrik Hudson on Riverside Drive between 110th and 111th Streets, proposed as a hotel but ultimately constructed as a residential building.

The northern part of the neighborhood is dominated by two residential complexes: Grant Houses and Morningside Gardens. Grant Houses, a public-housing development composed of ten buildings, is located on the south side of 125th Street, on two superblocks between Broadway and Morningside Avenue, with the site being bisected by Amsterdam Avenue. The six-building Morningside Gardens co-op is located directly southwest of the Grant Houses superblocks and is bound by 123rd and LaSalle Streets, Broadway, and Amsterdam Avenue.

=== Architectural landmarks ===
==== Official landmarks ====
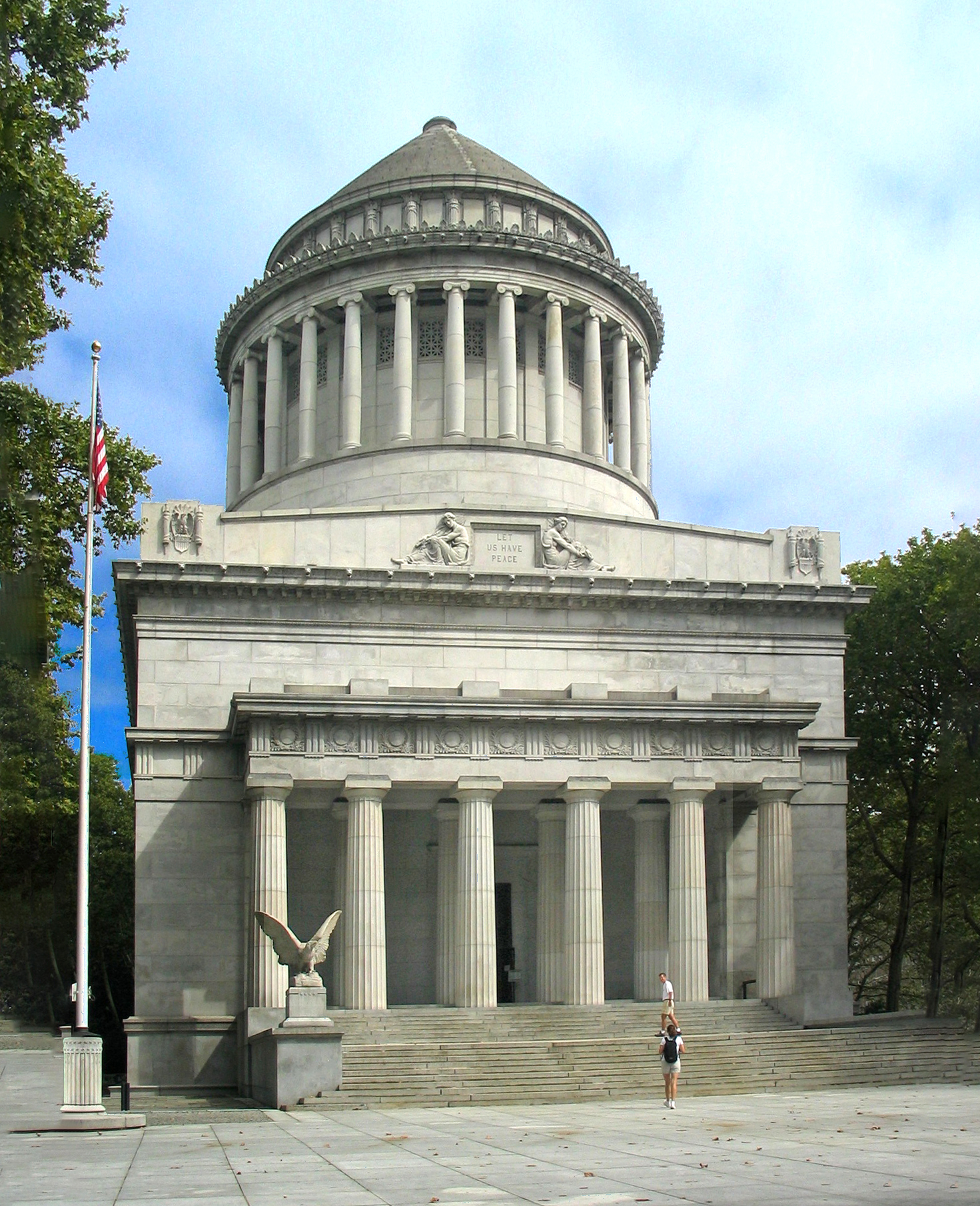
Grant's Tomb

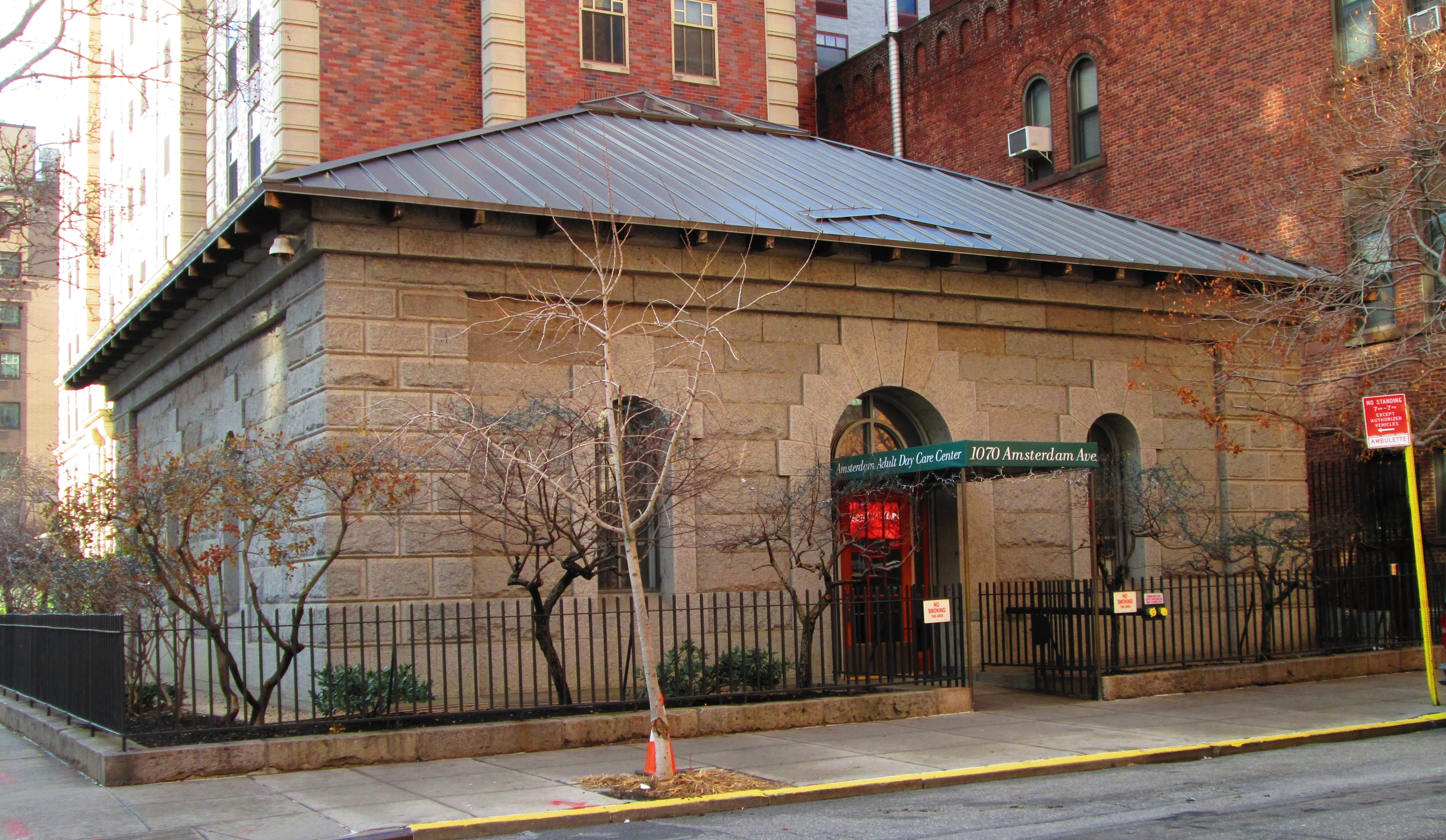
113th Street Gatehouse

Several sites in Morningside Heights have been designated by the New York City Landmarks Preservation Commission as official city landmarks and/or are listed on the National Register of Historic Places (NRHP). The Cathedral of St. John the Divine and its six-building cathedral close, on Amsterdam Avenue between 110th and 113th Streets, was designated by the city as an official landmark in 2017. Riverside Church, on Riverside Drive between 120th and 122nd Streets, is both a city landmark and NRHP site, as is the Church of Notre Dame at Morningside Drive and 114th Street.

Non-religious official landmarks in Morningside Heights include Grant's Tomb, a mausoleum for U.S. president Ulysses S. Grant and his wife Julia Grant. The tomb, located in the middle of Riverside Drive at 122nd Street, is a city landmark, a NRHP site, and a national memorial. The Plant and Scrymser pavilions at Mount Sinai Morningside, located on Morningside Drive between 113th and 114th Streets, were built in 1904–1906 and 1926–1928 respectively; both pavilions are recognized as city landmarks and are on the NRHP.

Numerous academic buildings in Morningside Heights contain a city or national landmark designation. On the Columbia campus, these sites include Low Memorial Library, a National Historic Landmark as well as a city-designated interior and exterior landmark. Other NRHP sites on the Columbia campus include Philosophy Hall, where FM radio was invented; Pupin Hall, a National Historic Landmark where the first experiments on the fission of uranium were conducted by Enrico Fermi; and Casa Italiana on the East Campus, which is also a city landmark. St. Paul's Chapel is designated as a city landmark but not as a national landmark. On the Barnard campus, NRHP-listed sites include Students' Hall; Brooks and Hewitt Halls; and Milbank, Brinckerhoff, and Fiske Halls. The Delta Psi, Alpha Chapter building on Riverside Drive is also listed on the NRHP. Additionally, the Union Theological Seminary complex is listed on the NRHP, and parts of the structure are also a city-designated landmark.

There are several traces of the old Croton Aqueduct's path through Morningside Heights, specifically under Amsterdam Avenue. Due to the presence of the 125th Street valley at the northern border of the neighborhood, the aqueduct descended into a deep level alignment, with the water being pushed through high-pressure open siphons at each end of the valley. Several gatehouses were built at Amsterdam Avenue and 113th, 119th, 134th–135th, and 142nd Streets, so that pipes could be installed when the aqueduct system was expanded in the future. The gatehouse at 113th Street was built in 1870 and rebuilt in 1890; it serves as an adult daycare center as of 2010. The gatehouse at 119th Street, a city landmark, was rebuilt in 1894–1895, replacing an earlier gatehouse in the middle of the road. The aqueduct continued to carry water until 1955. The 119th Street gatehouse was used until 1990; it then sat abandoned for several decades before being proposed for commercial use in 2018.

==== Historic district ====
In 2017, the New York City Landmarks Preservation Commission created the Morningside Heights Historic District. The district had first been proposed in 1996; however, Columbia was opposed to such a designation, which would have limited the university's flexibility as a landlord in Morningside Heights. The district includes 115 residential and institutional properties on West 109th Street west of Broadway; the blocks east and west of Broadway from Cathedral Parkway to West 113th Street; the blocks west of Broadway from West 113th to 118th Street; and the blocks west of Claremont Avenue from West 118th to 119th Street.

==== Other culturally significant locations ====
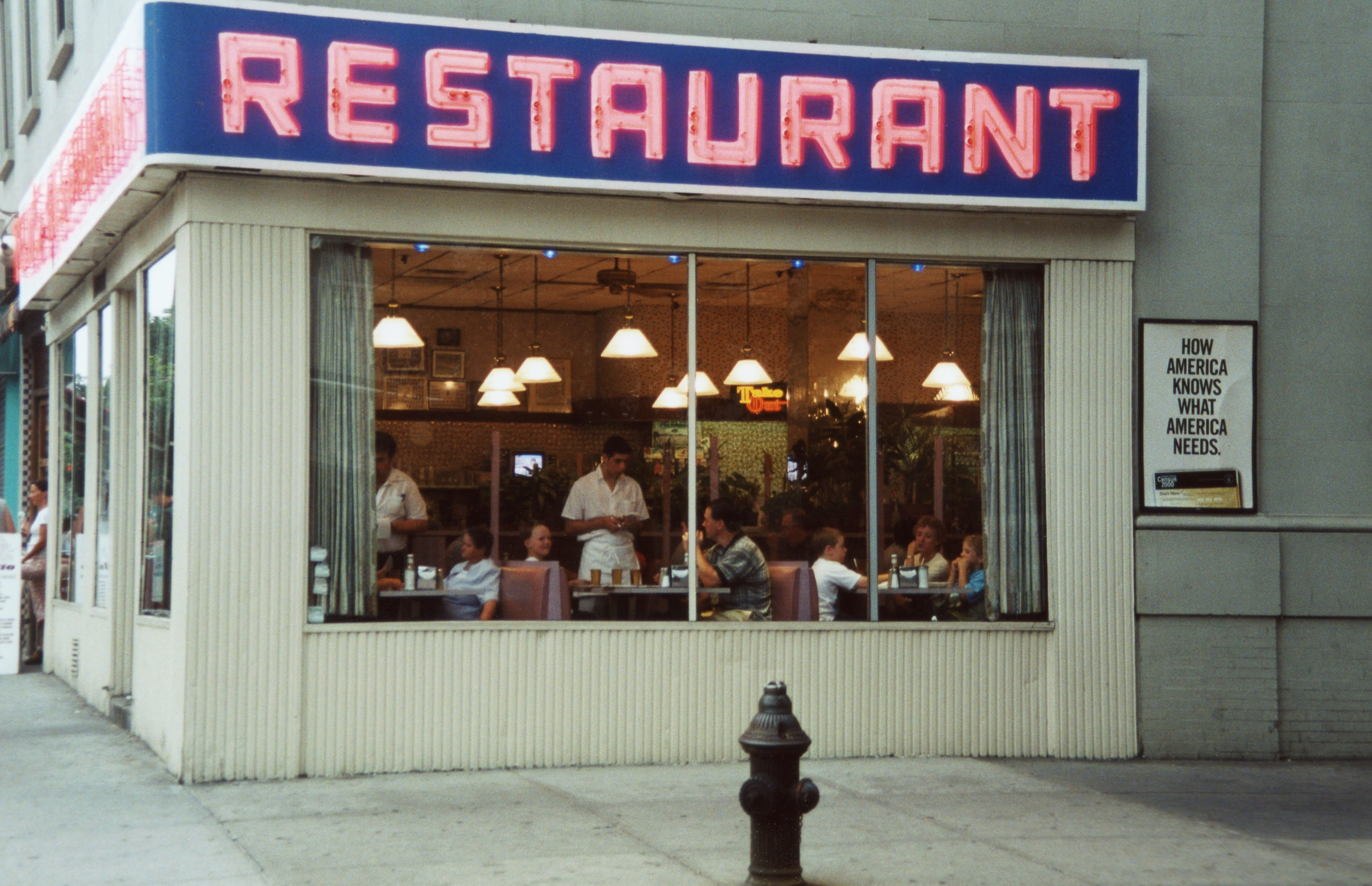
The real Tom's Restaurant, which appeared in Seinfeld

Tom's Restaurant, on Broadway at 112th Street, was featured in the 1980s song "Tom's Diner" by Suzanne Vega, an alumna of Barnard College. Later, exterior shots were used on the television sitcom Seinfeld as a stand-in for the diner hangout of the show's principal characters.

The West End Bar served especially as a meeting place for writers of the Beat Generation in the 1940s and 1950s, as well as for student activists in the years surrounding the Columbia University protests of 1968. In 2006, the establishment was absorbed into a Cuban restaurant chain, Havana Central. Later, the space was a bar and restaurant known as Bernheim & Schwartz before closing again.

The Hungarian Pastry Shop has long served as a regular place of visitation for students and professors at Columbia University, writers, and other residents of Morningside Heights and the Upper West Side.

=== Natural features ===
Morningside Heights is on a high plateau, bound on two sides by parks and on a third by a steep valley. Morningside Park is located east of Morningside Drive, on the eastern boundary of the neighborhood. The park was built because the area's steep topography created a cliff between the high ground of Morningside Heights to the west and the lower-lying land of Harlem to the east, making it impractical to build cross-streets through that area. This cliff was created through fault movement and smoothened during glacial periods. To the west is Riverside Park, the site of which was formerly rock outcroppings on the Hudson River. To the north is the 125th Street valley; the high plateau starts to descend into this valley at 122nd Street. It contains the Manhattanville Fault, which has seen earthquake activity as recently as 2001. The southern edge of the plateau, at 110th Street, is level with the neighboring Manhattan Valley neighborhood.

On West 114th Street, just west of Broadway, is a 30-foot-tall (9.1 m) outcropping of Manhattan schist called Rat Rock. The outcropping is located between two row houses at 600 and 604 West 114th Street.

== Police and crime ==
Morningside Heights is patrolled by the 26th Precinct of the NYPD, located at 520 West 126th Street. The 26th Precinct has a lower crime rate than in the 1990s, with crimes across all categories having decreased by 76.3% between 1990 and 2022. The precinct reported 1 murder, 16 rapes, 104 robberies, 142 felony assaults, 118 burglaries, 341 grand larcenies, and 79 grand larcenies auto in 2022. Of the five major violent felonies (murder, rape, felony assault, robbery, and burglary), the 26th Precinct had a rate of 612 crimes per 100,000 residents in 2019, compared to the boroughwide average of 632 crimes per 100,000 and the citywide average of 572 crimes per 100,000.

As of 2018, Community District 9 has a non-fatal assault hospitalization rate of 57 per 100,000 people, compared to the boroughwide rate of 49 per 100,000 and the citywide rate of 59 per 100,000. Its incarceration rate is 633 per 100,000 people, compared to the boroughwide rate of 407 per 100,000 and the citywide rate of 425 per 100,000.

Cathedral Parkway draws responders from the 26th and 24th NYPD precincts, where jurisdiction is settled once the incident is under control. Columbia University Public Safety also patrols the area around the college. Realtime access and review of CCTV imaging within Public Safety command centers of incidents within the blanket of coverage ranging from all corners of the neighborhood is available to reporting affiliates, NYPD detectives, and the general public for incidents invoking the Clery Act.

== Fire safety ==
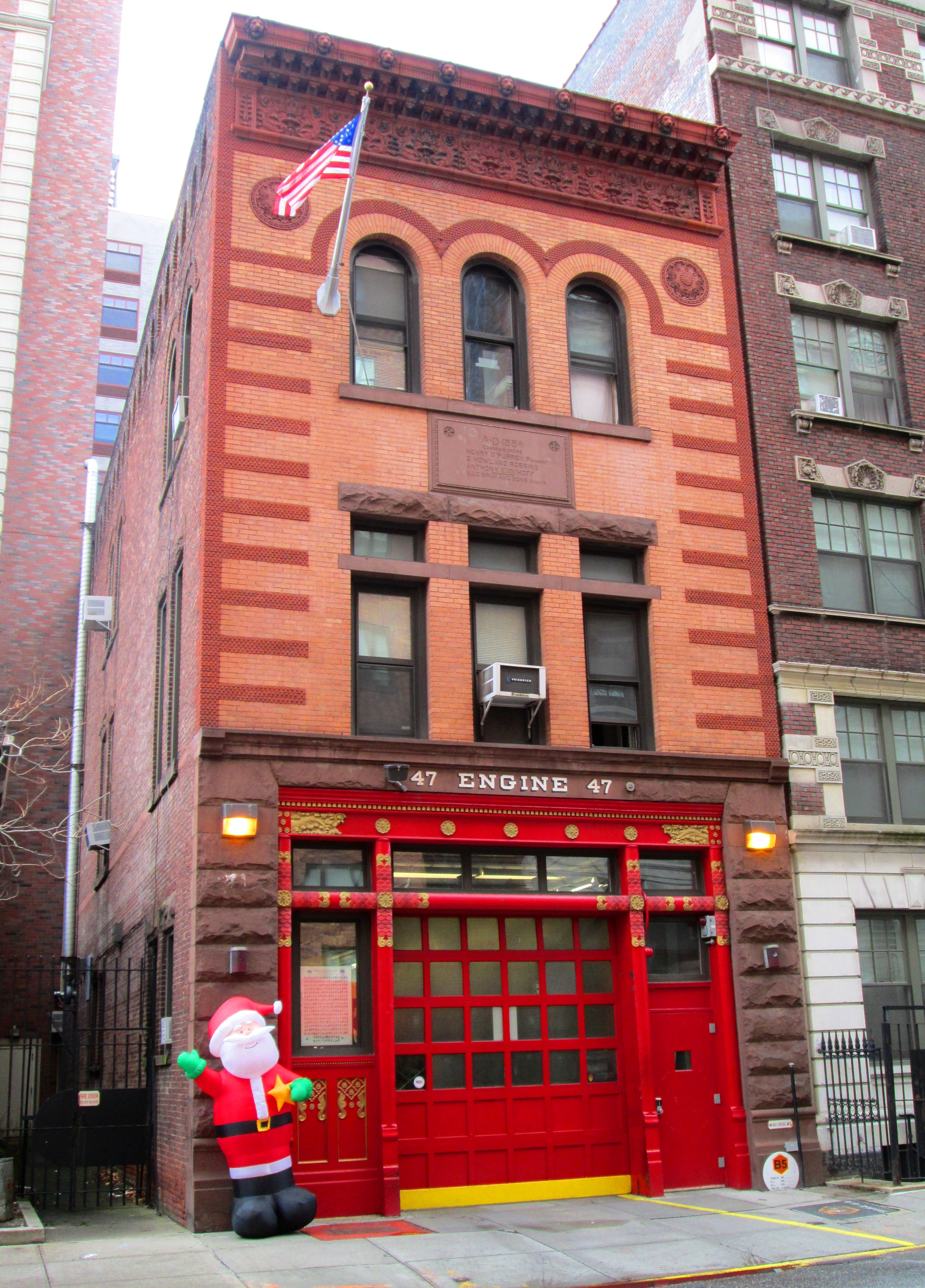
FDNY Engine Company 47

Morningside Heights is served by two New York City Fire Department (FDNY) stations. The main fire station for the neighborhood is Engine Company 47, located at 502 West 113th Street, next to the old Croton gatehouse. The three-story building, designed in the Romanesque Revival style, is 25 feet (7.6 m) wide, with a facade of brick and brownstone, as well as Neoclassical-style brownstone and terracotta detailing. The building was erected in 1891 by Napoleon LeBrun & Sons, a prolific builder of New York City firehouses in the late 19th century, and was one of the first major structures in Morningside Heights. It was designated a New York City landmark in 1997.

The other fire station serving Morningside Heights is Engine Company 37/Ladder Company 40, located at 415 West 125th Street, just across the neighborhood's border with Manhattanville.

== Health ==
As of 2018, preterm births and births to teenage mothers in Community District 9 were lower than the city average, with 82 preterm births per 1,000 live births (compared to 87 per 1,000 citywide), and 10.9 births to teenage mothers per 1,000 live births (compared to 19.3 per 1,000 citywide). Community District 9 has a low population of residents who are uninsured. In 2018, this population was estimated to be 11%, slightly less than the citywide rate of 12%.

The concentration of fine particulate matter, the deadliest type of air pollutant, in Community District 9 is 0.008 milligrams per cubic metre (8.0×10^{−9} oz/ft^{3}), more than the city average. Seventeen percent of Community District 9 residents are smokers, which is more than the city average of 14% of residents being smokers. In Community District 9, 21% of residents are obese, 10% are diabetic, and 29% have high blood pressure—compared to the citywide averages of 24%, 11%, and 28% respectively. In addition, 25% of children are obese, compared to the citywide average of 20%.

Eighty-eight percent of residents eat some fruits and vegetables every day, about the same as the city's average of 87%. In 2018, 83% of residents described their health as "good", "very good", or "excellent", more than the city's average of 78%. For every supermarket in Community District 9, there are 11 bodegas.

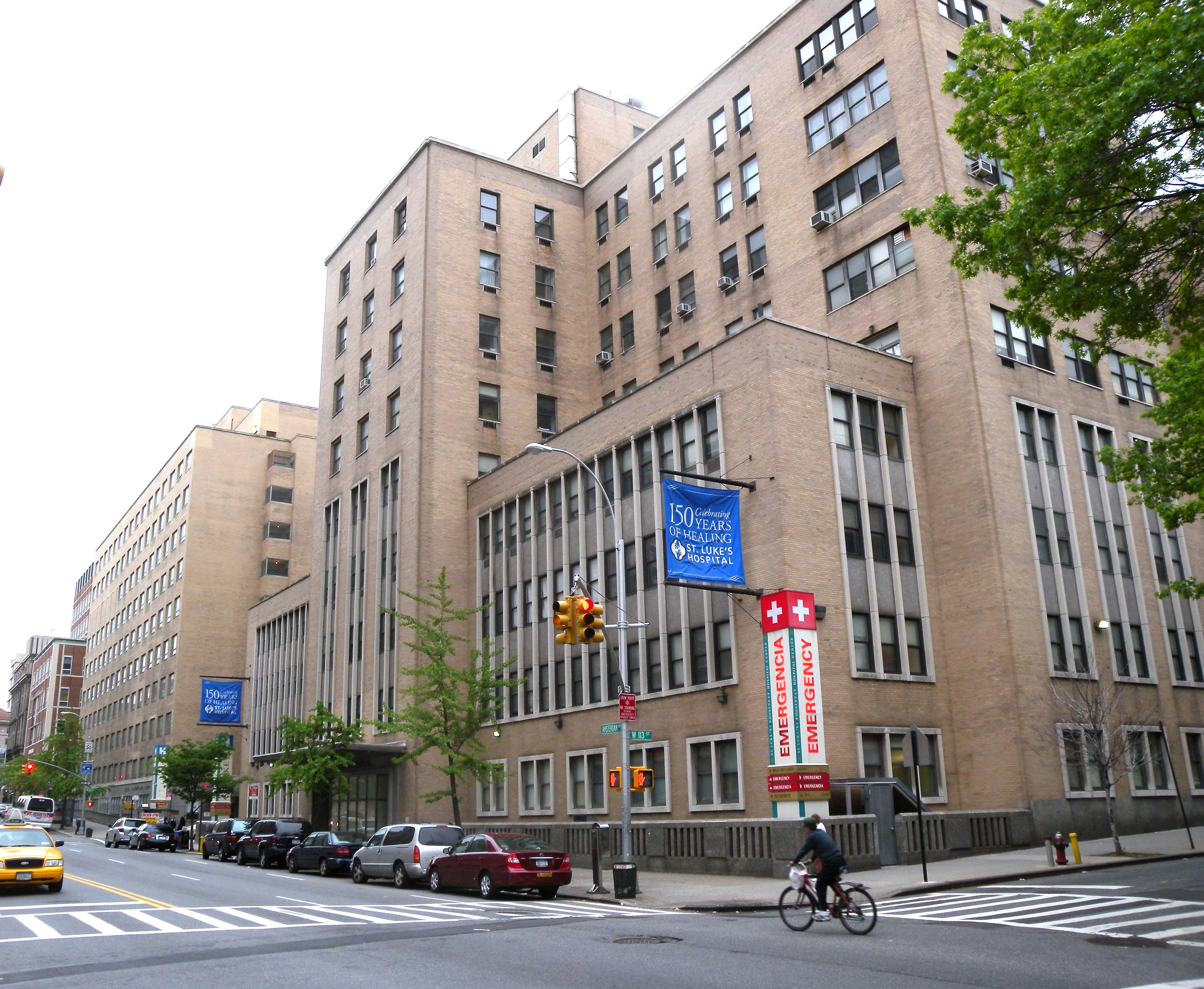
Mount Sinai Morningside

The primary hospital in Morningside Heights is Mount Sinai Morningside, located on Amsterdam Avenue between 113th and 115th Streets. In addition, NYC Health + Hospitals/Harlem is located in Harlem, and Mount Sinai Hospital is located in East Harlem.

== Politics ==
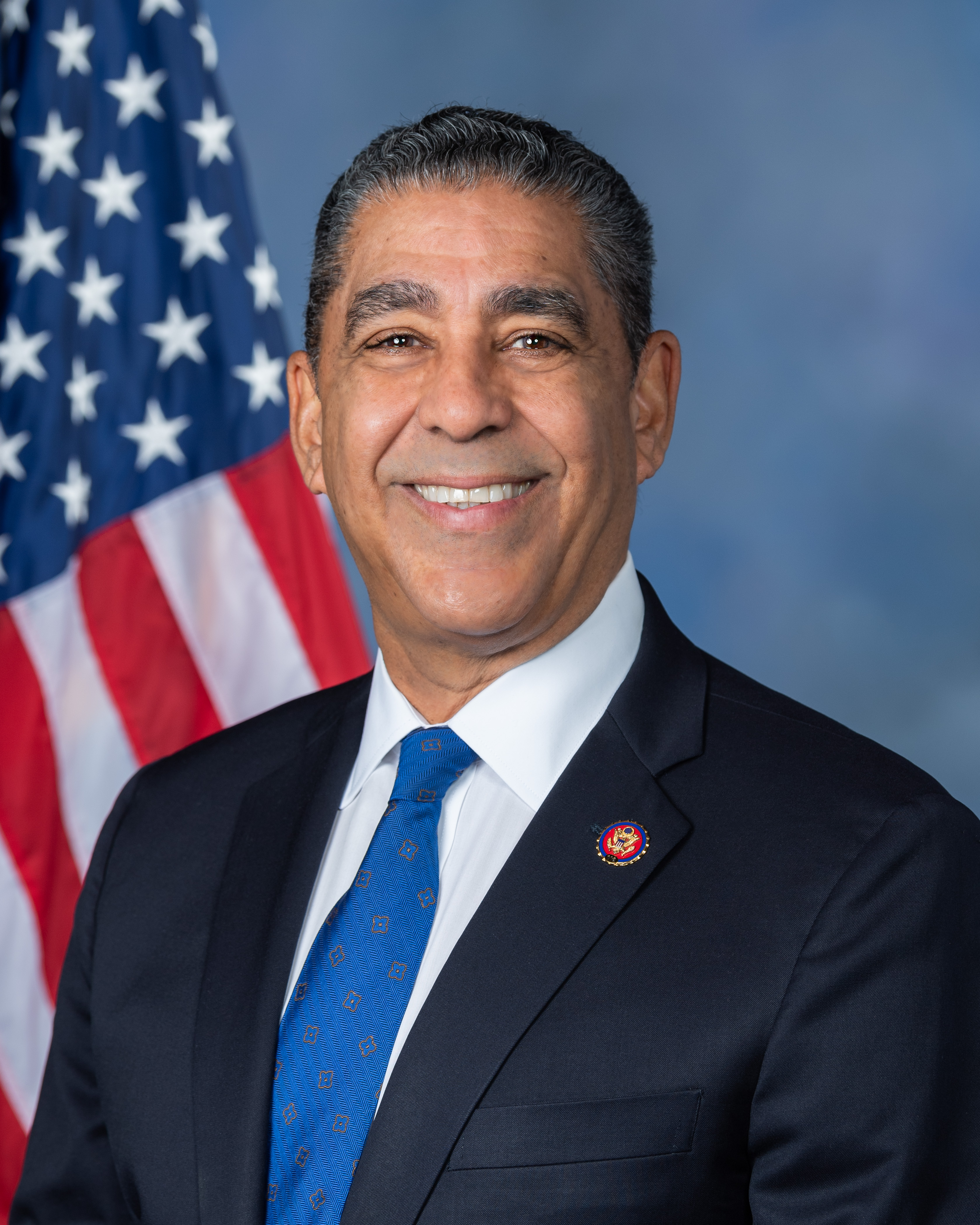
Adriano Espaillat

Politically, Morningside Heights is in New York's 13th congressional district for the U.S. House of Representatives, represented by Democrat Adriano Espaillat since 2017. On the state level, it is in the New York State Senate's 30th district, represented by Democrat Cordell Cleare, and the New York State Assembly's 69th district represented by Democrat Micah Lasher. On the city level, it is in the New York City Council's 7th district, represented by Democrat Shaun Abreu.

== Post offices and ZIP Codes ==
Morningside Heights is located in two primary ZIP Codes. The area south of 116th Street is part of 10025, and the area north of 116th Street is part of 10027. The United States Postal Service operates two post offices near Morningside Heights: the Columbia University Station at 534 West 112th Street, and the Manhattanville Station and Morningside Annex at 365 West 125th Street.

== Education ==
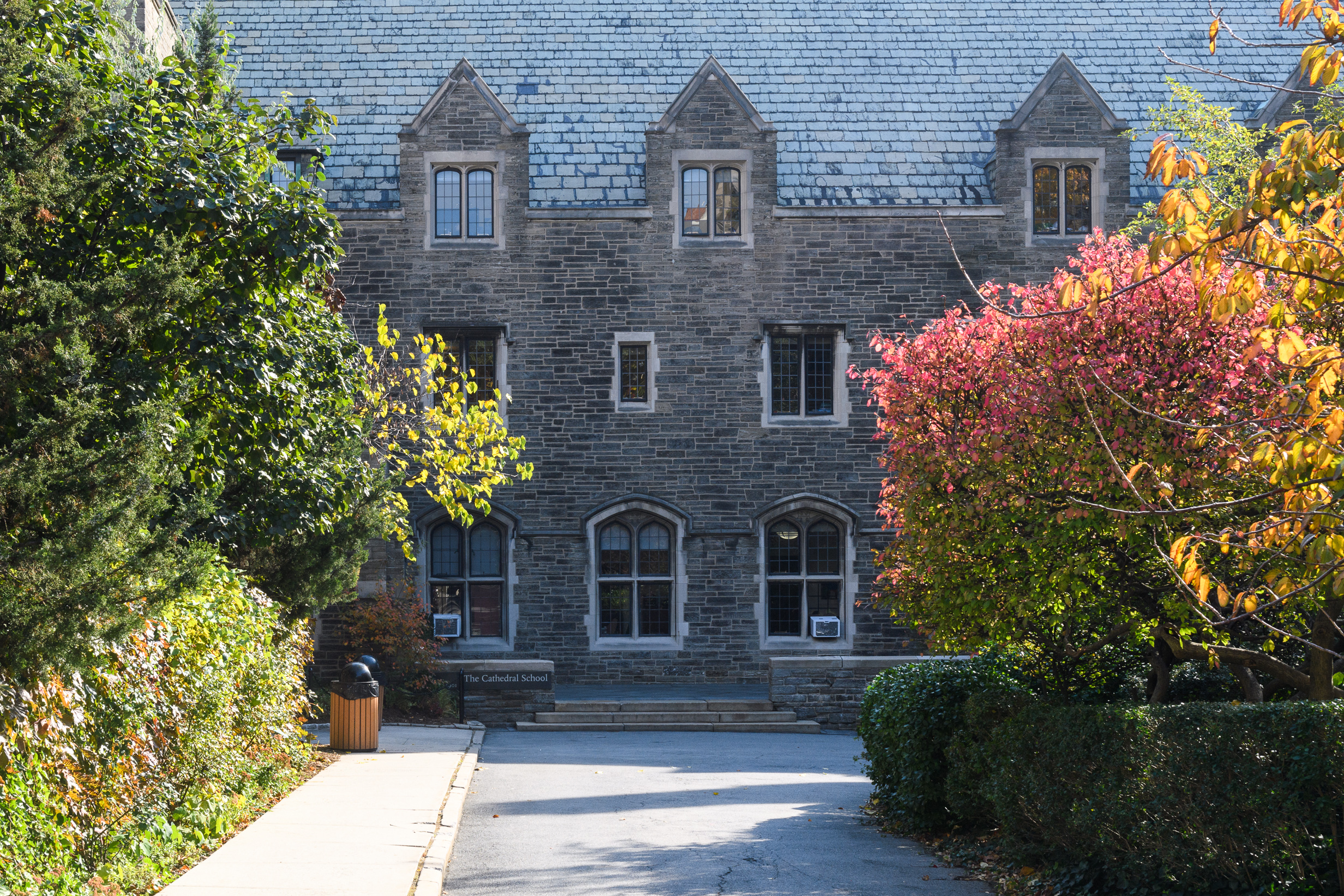
The Cathedral School of St. John the Divine

Community District 9 generally has a higher rate of college-educated residents than the rest of the city as of 2018. A plurality of residents age 25 and older (49%) have a college education or higher, while 21% have less than a high school education and 30% are high school graduates or have some college education. By contrast, 64% of Manhattan residents and 43% of city residents have a college education or higher. The percentage of Community District 9 students excelling in math rose from 25% in 2000 to 49% in 2011 and reading achievement increased from 32% to 35% during the same period.

Community District 9's rate of elementary school student absenteeism is higher than the rest of New York City. In Community District 9, 27% of elementary school students missed twenty or more days per school year, more than the citywide average of 20%. Additionally, 65% of high school students in Community District 9 graduate on time, less than the citywide average of 75%.

=== Schools ===
The New York City Department of Education operates the following public schools in Morningside Heights as part of Community School Districts 3 and 5:

- Columbia Secondary School (grades 6–12)
- PS 36 Margaret Douglas (grades PK-5)
- PS 125 Ralph Bunche (grades PK-5)
- PS 180 Hugo Newman (grades PK-8)

The demographic compositions of these public schools' student bodies vary widely. In 2015, The New York Times reported that PS 36 had a student body that was 96% black and Hispanic, with a median family income of $36,000. This contrasted with the overall neighborhood demographics, which at the time were only 37% black and Hispanic, with a median income of $69,000.

Private schools include Bank Street School for Children, St. Hilda's & St. Hugh's School, the Cathedral School of St. John the Divine, and the School at Columbia University. All serve grades PK-8, except the Cathedral School of St. John the Divine, which serves grades K-8. In addition, the neighborhood contains one charter school, KIPP Star Harlem Middle School.

=== Higher education ===
The label Academic Acropolis has been used to describe the area due to its topography and its high concentration of academic institutions. Much of the neighborhood is the campus of Columbia University, a private Ivy League research university, which owns a large amount of non-campus real estate. The original campus stretches from Broadway to Amsterdam Avenue between 116th and 120th Streets, while the South Field campus is located between Broadway and Amsterdam Avenues from 114th to 116th Streets. The East Campus of Columbia University is located east of Amsterdam Avenue between 114th and 120th Streets, interspersed with the regular street grid. NASA's Goddard Institute for Space Studies is also located in the neighborhood, directly above Tom's Restaurant in a building owned by Columbia University.

Four educational institutions are located on the west side of Broadway, between Claremont Avenue to the west and Broadway to the east. Barnard College, a private women's college, is located between 116th and 119th Streets. Immediately to the north, between 119th and 120th Streets, is the Teachers College at Columbia University. North of Teachers College is Union Theological Seminary, which occupies the block between 120th and 122nd Streets. A portion of the block north of 122nd Street, the site of the Institute of Musical Art and Juilliard School, later became the Manhattan School of Music.

On the east side of Broadway, across from the Manhattan School of Music, is the Jewish Theological Seminary of America. West of Teachers College is New York Theological Seminary, a non-denominational Christian seminary inside the Interchurch Center between Riverside Drive and Claremont Avenue. Further south is the Bank Street College of Education, located on 112th Street between Broadway and Riverside Drive. In addition, the International House at Riverside Drive and 122nd Street serves as a dormitory for students attending nearby educational institutions.

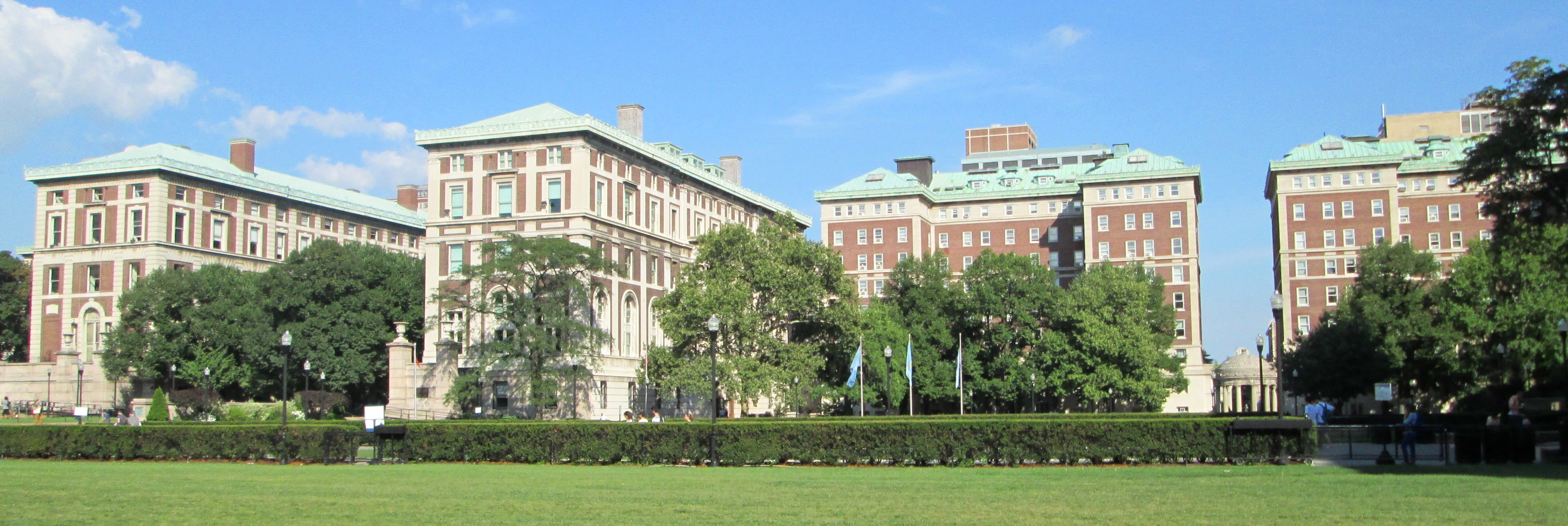
Panorama of part of the Columbia University campus, looking east from the South Lawn

=== Libraries ===
The New York Public Library (NYPL) operates two branches in Morningside Heights. The Morningside Heights branch is located at 2900 Broadway. The branch originally opened in 1914 within Columbia University's Low Memorial Library, then moved to Columbia's Butler Library in 1937 upon the latter's completion. The Morningside Heights branch moved to a temporary site in 1996, while the Butler Library was being renovated, and then relocated into its current building in 2001.

The George Bruce branch is located at 518 West 125th Street. It is named after the inventor, printer, and industrialist George Bruce, whose daughter built the original George Bruce Library at 42nd Street in 1888. The current three-story structure, designed by Carrère and Hastings, was constructed in 1915 and renovated in 2001.

== Religion ==
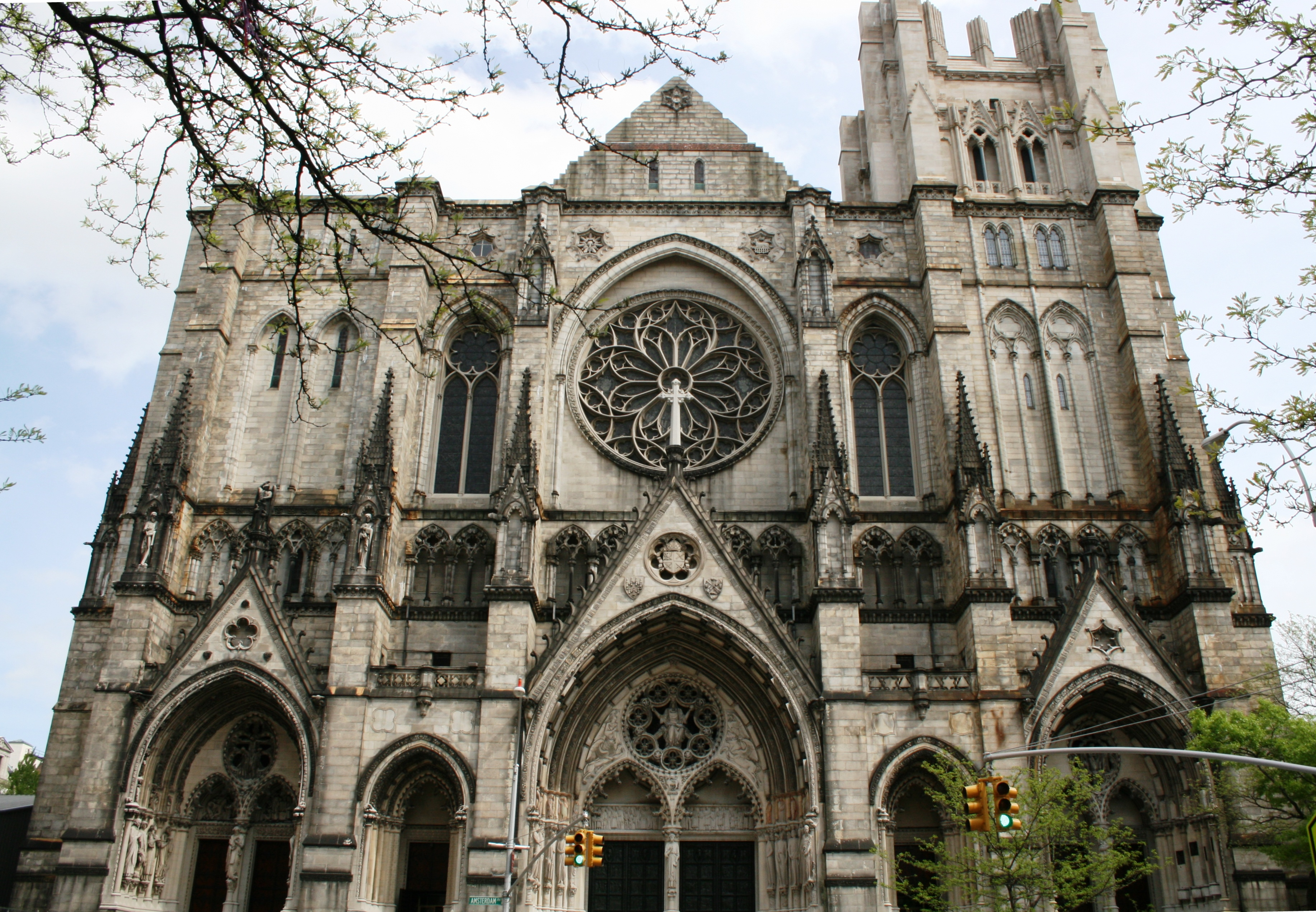
Cathedral of St. John the Divine

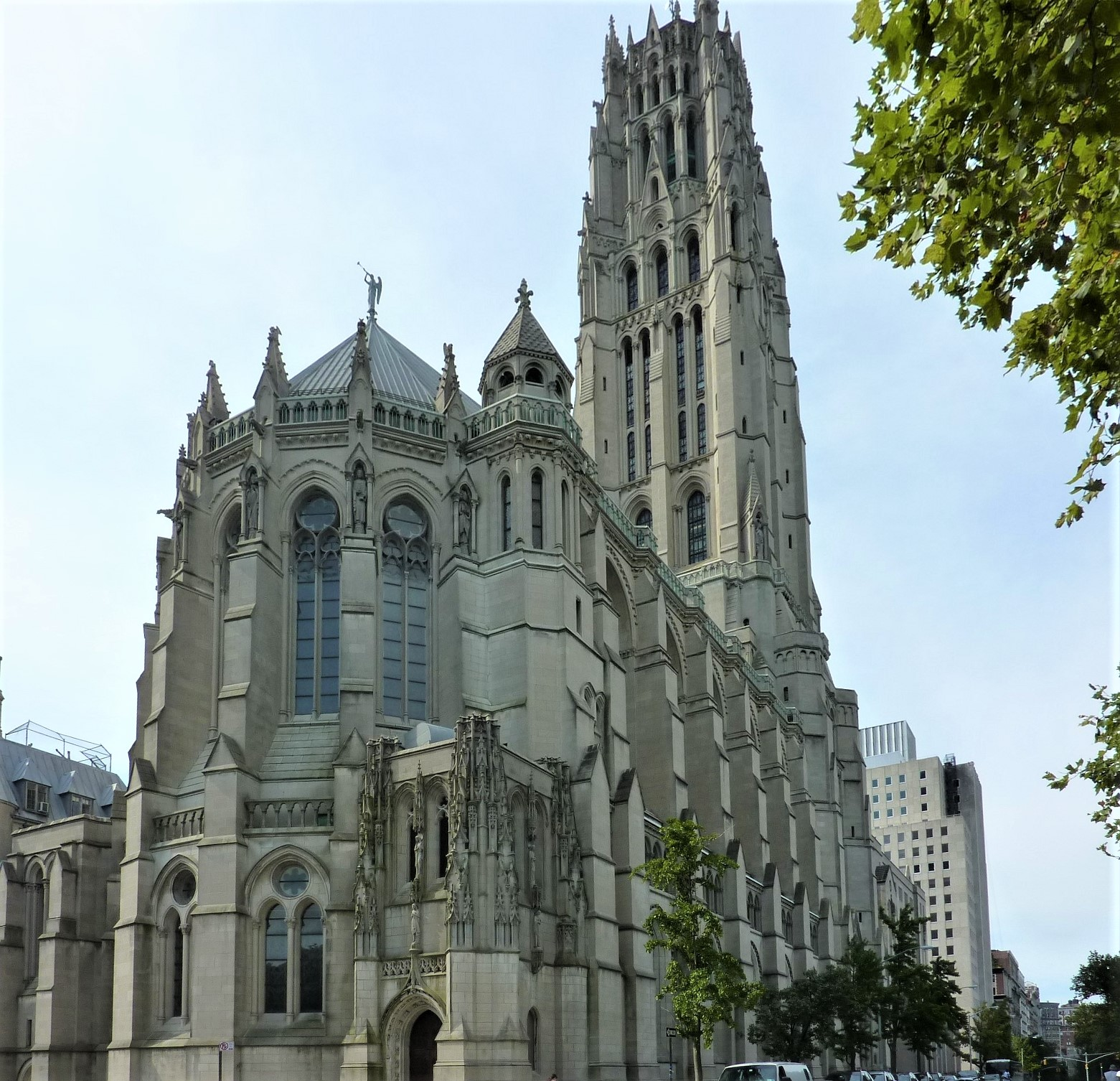
Riverside Church

Morningside Heights contains numerous religious institutions, including two architecturally prominent churches. The Cathedral of St. John the Divine, the seat of the Episcopal Diocese of New York on Amsterdam Avenue, is an unfinished building that ranks among the largest churches in the world. Riverside Church on Riverside Drive is an interdenominational church associated with the Baptists.

Several other religiously affiliated institutions are located in the neighborhood, including the Church of Notre Dame, a Roman Catholic church on 114th Street that is part of the Archdiocese of New York. Corpus Christi Church, a Roman Catholic church, is located at 535 West 121st Street. There are several other churches in Morningside Heights, including the Broadway Presbyterian Church at 114th Street and Broadway, and the West Side Unitarian Church on 550 Cathedral Parkway, the latter of which was converted into a synagogue called Congregation Ramath Orah in the 1940s. The city's oldest Korean church, the Korean Methodist Church and Institute, has owned 633 West 115th Street since 1927. Additionally, The Interchurch Center, at 120th Street and Riverside Drive, was built in 1960 and is an office building for religious organizations.

== Transportation ==
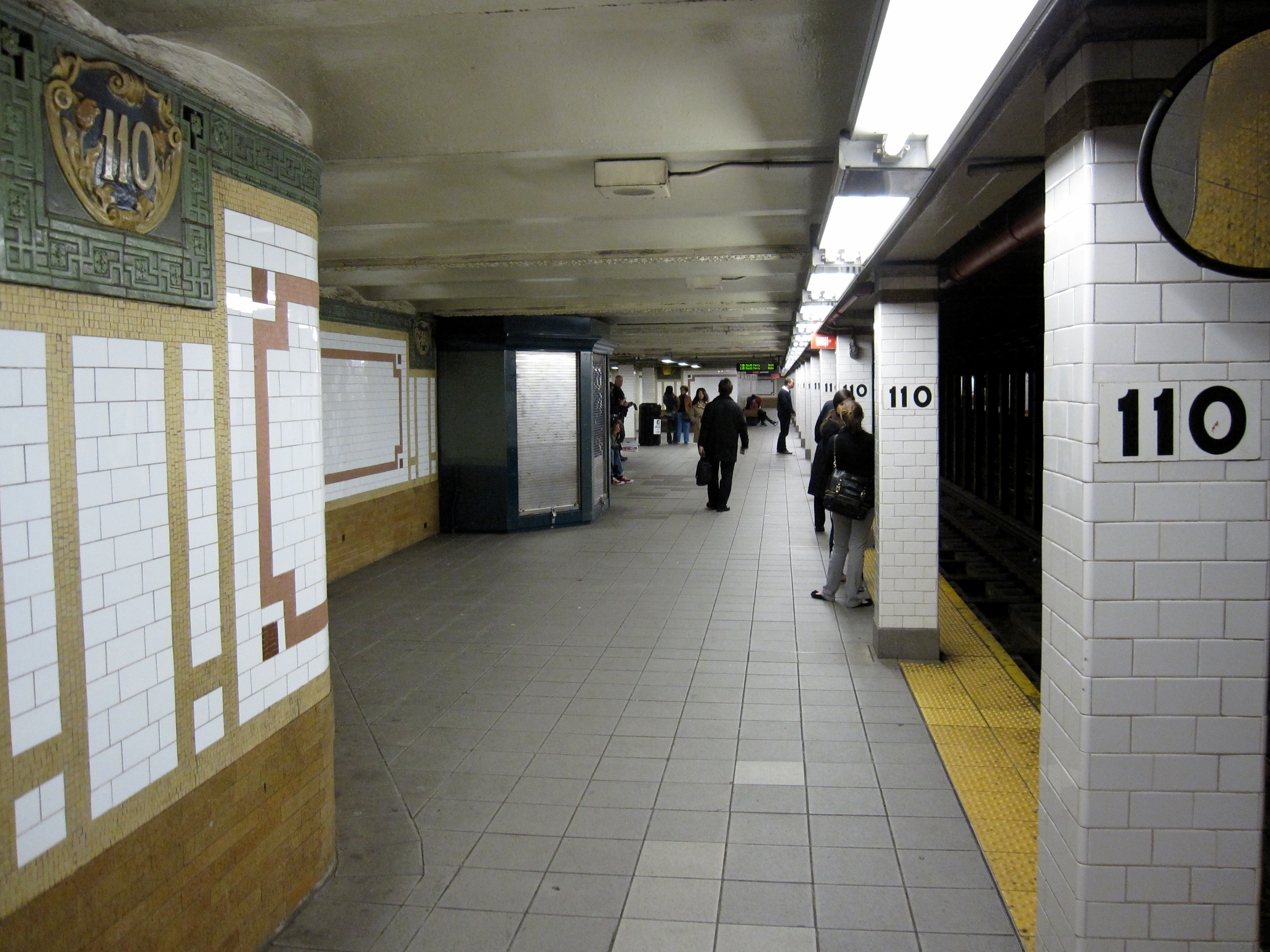
Cathedral Parkway–110th Street station

The area is served by the New York City Subway at the Cathedral Parkway–110th Street and 116th Street–Columbia University stations of the IRT Broadway–Seventh Avenue Line (served by the 1 train). The stations are among the original subway stations built for the Interborough Rapid Transit Company and opened in 1904; their interiors are designated as official New York City landmarks. In addition, the viaduct carrying the Broadway–Seventh Avenue Line over the 125th Street valley, including the 125th Street station, is designated a New York City landmark and on the National Register of Historic Places. The portion of the viaduct between 122nd and 125th Streets is located in Morningside Heights.

Additionally, New York City Bus service includes the M4, M5, M11, M60 SBS and M104 routes. These routes travel largely north–south through Morningside Heights. Fare-free Columbia Transportation and Barnard Public Safety Shuttle also operate through the area.

== Notable people ==
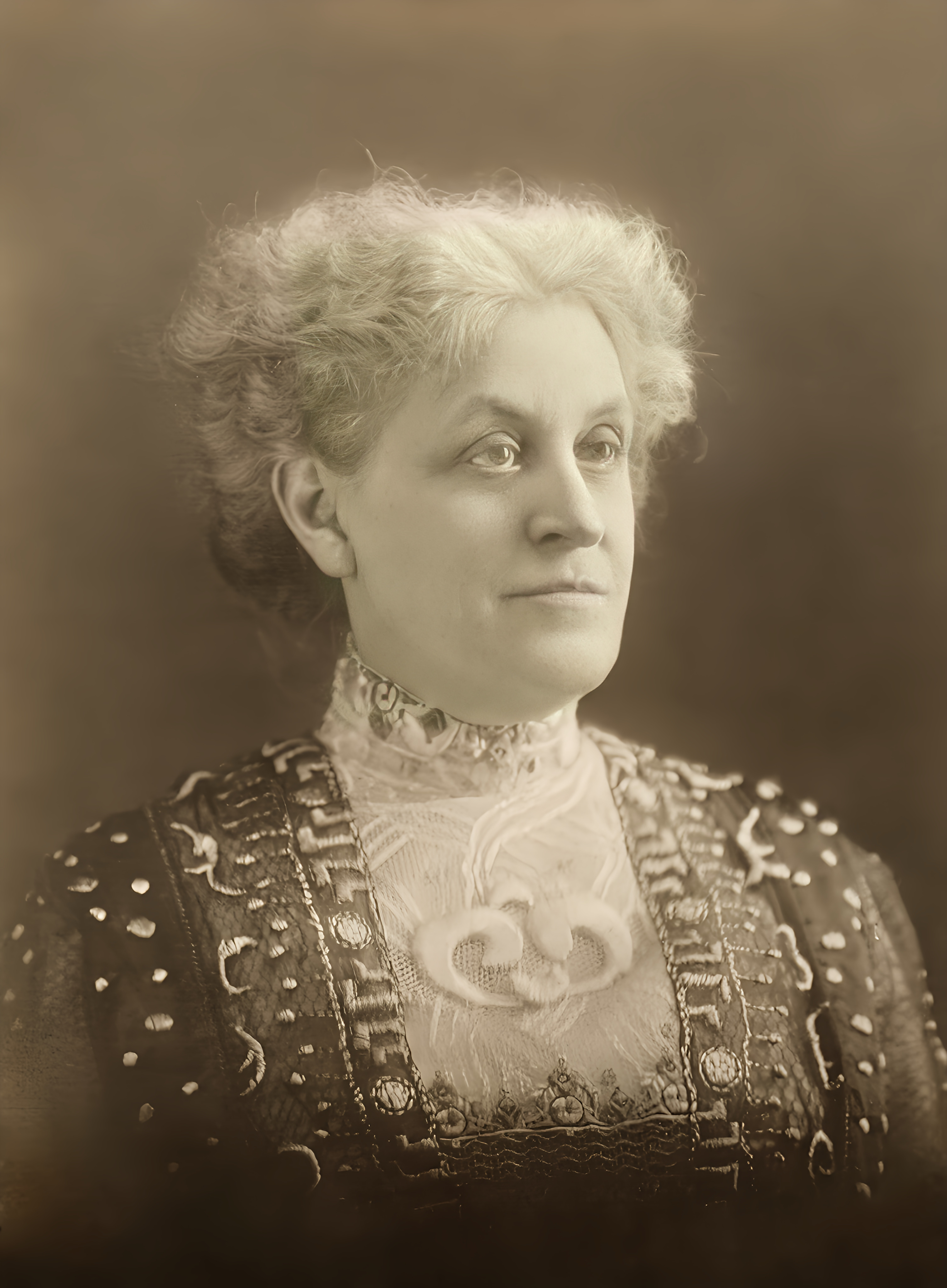
Carrie Chapman Catt

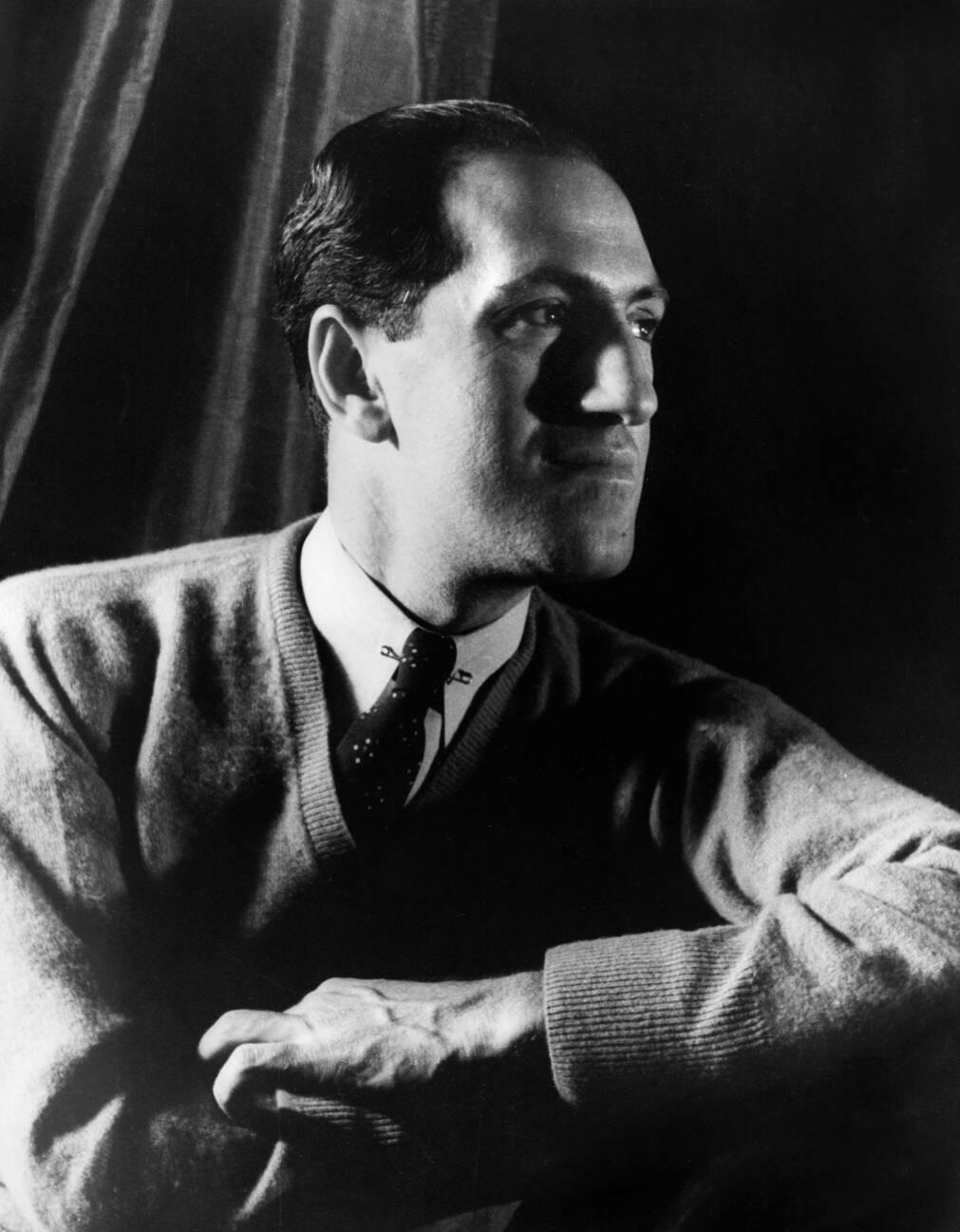
George Gershwin

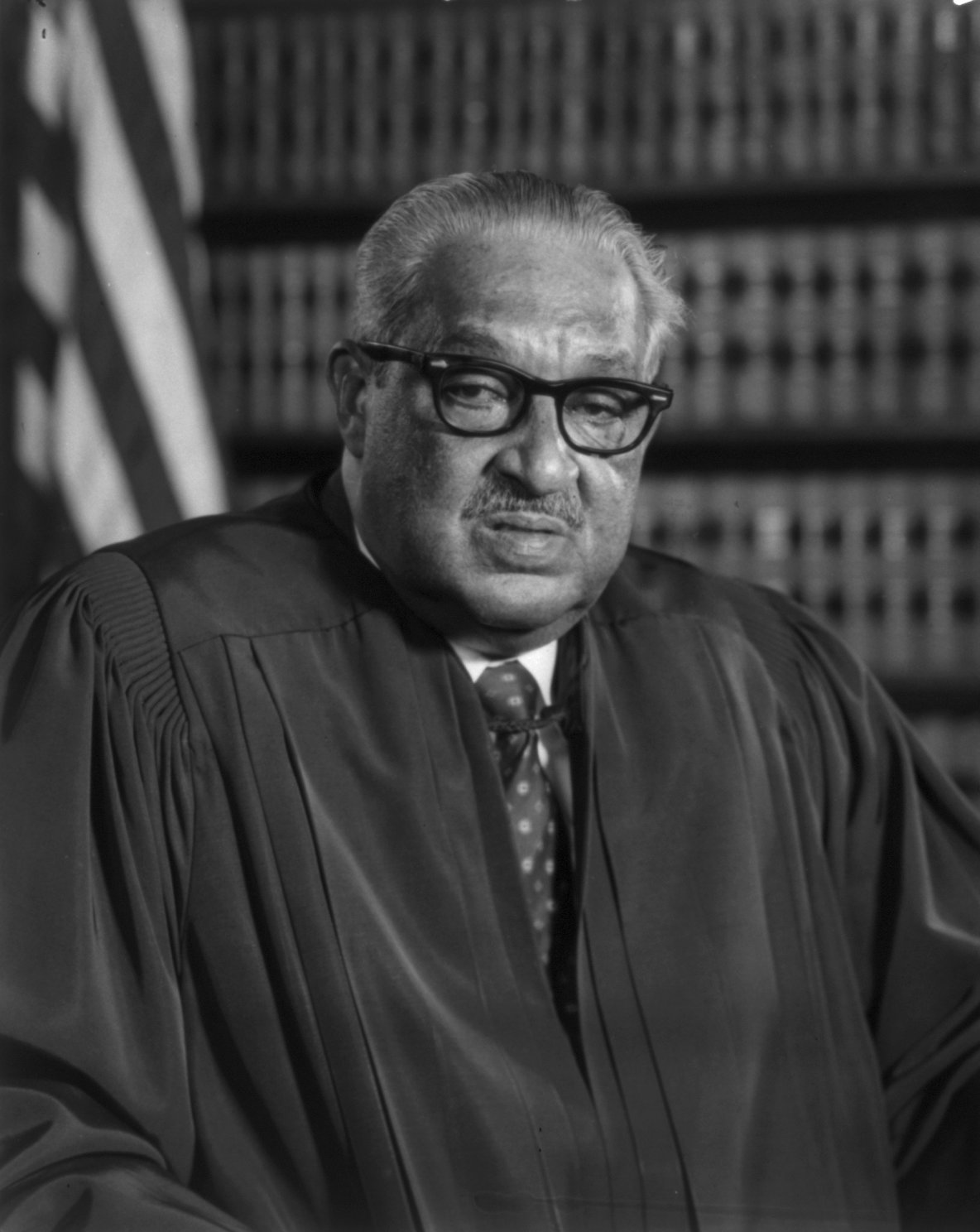
Thurgood Marshall

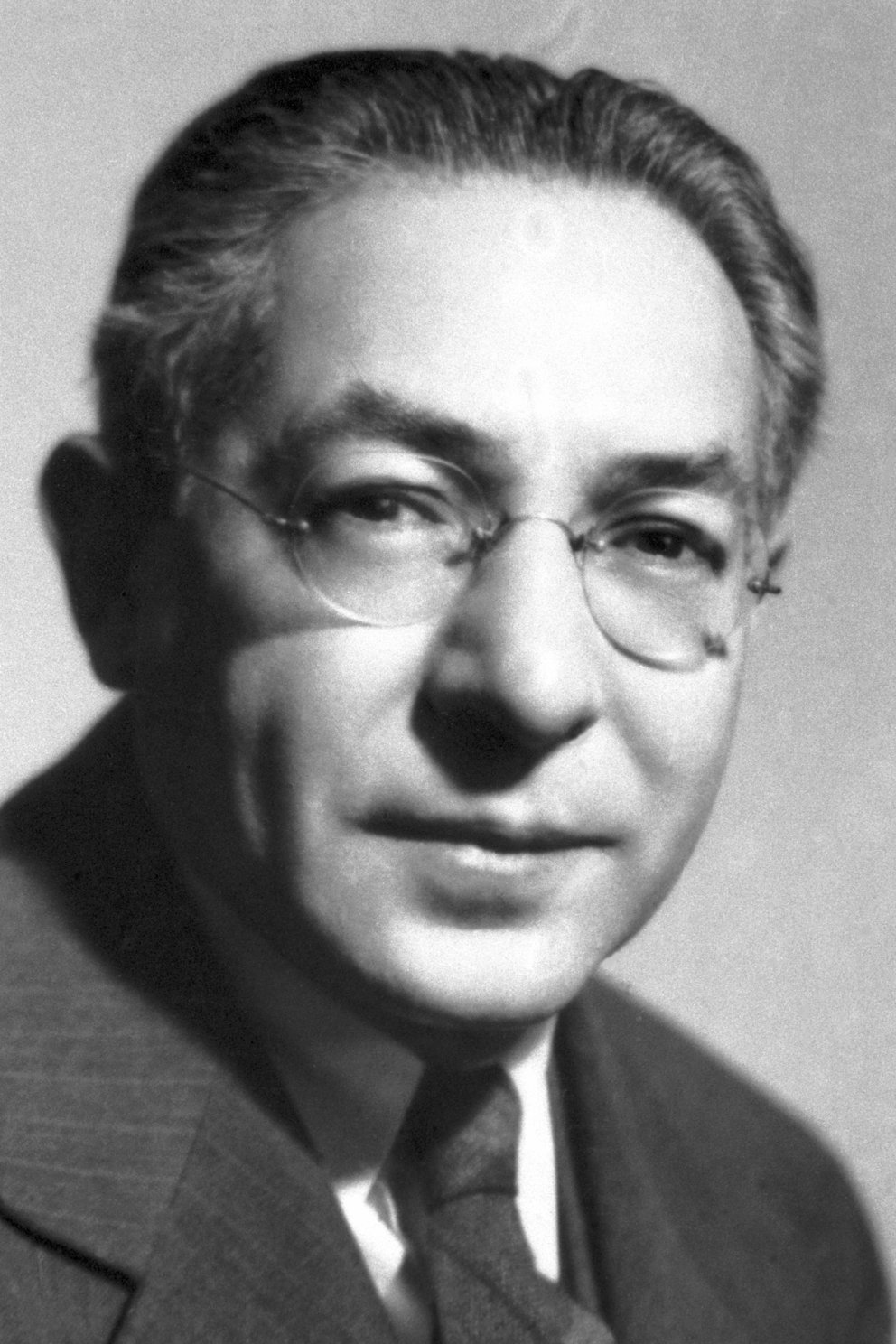
Isidor Rabi

- Zohran Mamdani, Mayor of New York City was raised in Morningside Heights
- Fiona Apple, singer-songwriter, pianist, grew up in Morningside Heights.
- Hannah Arendt, political theorist, historian, philosopher, lived at 370 Riverside Drive.
- Francis X. Bushman, film actor and director, lived at 435 Riverside Drive (The Colosseum).
- George Carlin, comedian, grew up on West 121st Street; the block of 121st Street where he lived was dedicated to him in October 2014. He used to say that he and his friends called the area "White Harlem", because it sounded more intimidating. Morningside Heights is alternately called West Harlem.
- Carrie Chapman Catt, suffragist, lived at 404 Riverside Drive.
- Elliott Carter, composer, lived at 420 Riverside Drive.
- Owen Davis, dramatist, lived at 15 Claremont Avenue.
- Cecil B. DeMille, film director and actor, lived at 622 West 114th Street.
- John Dewey, academic, philosopher, psychologist, and educational reformer., lived at 545 West 112th Street.
- Theodore E. Ferris, naval architect and engineer, lived at 431 Riverside Drive.
- F. Scott Fitzgerald, novelist, lived at 200 Claremont Avenue while working in advertising and writing This Side of Paradise.
- George Barry Ford, Catholic priest who led Thomas Merton to conversion. Fr. Ford is thanked in the liner notes to George Carlin's 1972 album Class Clown.
- George Gershwin, composer and pianist, began composing his Rhapsody in Blue while living at 501 West 110th Street.
- Allen Ginsberg, poet, lived at 536 West 114th Street.
- Mary Garrett Hay, suffragist, lived at 404 Riverside Drive.
- Abraham Joshua Heschel, rabbi, lived at 425 Riverside Drive.
- Ely Jacques Kahn, architect, lived at 25 Claremont Avenue.
- Jack Kerouac, novelist, lived at 421 West 118th Street.
- Abraham E. Lefcourt, clothing manufacturer and developer, lived at 80 Riverside Drive.
- Marcus Loew, early film magnate, lived at 380 Riverside Drive.
- Thurgood Marshall, the first African-American Supreme Court justice, lived in Morningside Gardens.
- Isidor Rabi, physicist who received the Nobel Prize in Physics
- Grantland Rice, sportswriter, lived at 450 Riverside Drive.
- Megan Rice, S.H.C.J., Catholic nun and antinuclear activist, grew up there. One of her addresses was 468 Riverside Drive.
- Theodore Roberts, actor, lived at 605 West 111th Street.
- Richard Rodgers, composer, worked primarily in musical theater. the first entertainer to win the EGOT (Emmy, Grammy, Oscar, and Tony Awards).
- Harlan Fiske Stone, the Chief Justice of the United States Supreme Court, lived at 435 Riverside Drive (The Colosseum) while serving as Dean of Columbia Law School.
- David Torrence, actor, lived at 620 West 116th Street.
- Lionel Trilling, literary critic, short story writer, essayist, and professor.
- Walter S. Trumbull, sportswriter, lived at 450 Riverside Drive.
