= East Campus (Columbia University) =

Coordinates: 40°48′25.7″N 73°57′32.11″W

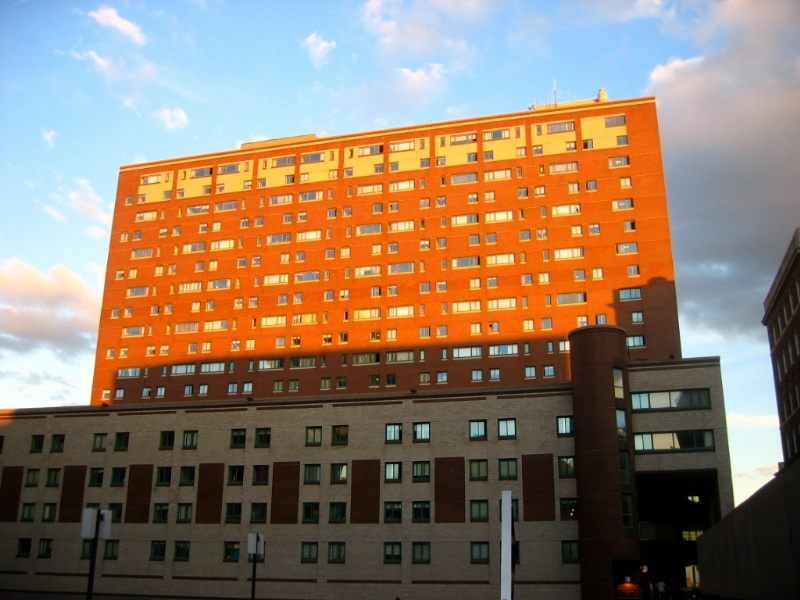
- East Campus' western facade

General information
- Address: 70 Morningside Drive, New York City, New York
- Opened: 1981
- Owner: Columbia University

Technical details
- Floor count: 20

Design and construction
- Architect(s): Gwathmey Siegel & Associates Architects

East Campus is a prominent building on the Morningside Heights campus of Columbia University in New York City, located along Morningside Drive between 117th and 118th Streets. One of the tallest buildings in the neighborhood, it serves primarily as a residence hall for Columbia undergraduates, although it also contains the university's Center for Career Education, its Facilities Management office, and the Heyman Center for the Humanities. East Campus, a $28.7 million facility, was designed by Gwathmey Siegel & Associates Architects and built in 1979-1982.

== History ==
An earlier plan for East Campus (1965), by Harrison and Abromowitz architects, included twin concrete slab towers. Along with the rest of the ambitious expansion plans of University President Grayson L. Kirk, it was scrapped in the wake of the 1968 protests against, among other things, a university gym proposed for nearby Morningside Park. When expansion finally did reach East Campus, by the late 1970s, the university was seeking a more humanist design, one which would both harmonize better with the surrounding campus and reflect, to some degree, the residential college quads of Oxford and Yale.

When East Campus opened, students appreciated its expansive suite space, commanding views, and spacious townhouses, which were a relieving contrast to cramped conditions in much of the rest of the university's housing. Many of the outer townhouses were donated and built by famous Columbia University benefactors. The most notable of these is Thomas J. Watson, Jr. who donated the popular Watson House. Donor George Delacorte, for whom the building's central courtyard is formally named, said of his former room at the university "we had two nails on the wall for a closet...now I've paid for a dormitory where boys loll around in marble bathtubs." The bathrooms are not, however, actually marble, but imitate that material.

The main high-rise building was named Hudson Hall, named after prominent stockbroker Percy K. Hudson (1877–1962), who was married to actress Vida Whitmore.

On October 10, 1985, a Columbia engineering student, Sarah M. Thomas, was stabbed in her East Campus suite by an intruder, a man who had been signed in as a guest by another resident. It was one of a number of violent crimes in the Columbia dormitories during the 1980s.

An inspection in 1987 revealed that the tiled exterior which had earned the building accolades had begun to peel off its facade, and a large chunk collapsed into its courtyard in February 1988, prompting the university to order its recladding, a $15 million project handled by the architects Gruzen Samton Steinglass, in the campus' traditional red brick and limestone. In the course of the scandal, Columbia sued both Gwathmey Siegel and the engineering firm that had worked on the project.

In 2006, a homophobic message written on a dry-erase board in East Campus was denounced as a hate crime, the sixth one alleged that year, and prompted the creation of the controversial student group Stop Hate on Columbia's Campus (SHOCC).

== Architecture ==
East Campus was originally clad in red and white tiles, a surfacing architectural critics praised as innovative. The American Institute of Architects Guide to New York City called it "elegant and handsome". Reception to the building was mixed overall. Architecture critic Ada Louise Huxtable wrote of East Campus:

"Consider a building that has to be vandal-proof, constructed of maintenance-free materials, with every surface resistant to neglect and abuse, where violation of design and function must be an anticipated fact, along with defacement and petty thievery - a place where surveillance is a necessity and the population is transient. A description of a maximum security prison? Not at all. This is a dormitory at Columbia University."

== Notable residents ==
East Campus was home to writer and musician Michael Azerrad, US presidential adviser and television news personality George Stephanopoulos, journalist Olivier Knox, actors Matthew Fox, Julia Stiles and Rider Strong, digital media scholar Peter Lunenfeld, former Lionsgate Films president Erik Feig, and Olympic gold medalist Cristina Teuscher. Political cartoonist Ted Rall also lived in East Campus, but was kicked out after targeting pedestrians below his window with water balloons. In 2018, however, the building has begun to show signs of aging, with frequent flooding leading to many displeased undergraduate upperclassmen.

Columbia professor Robert E. Harrist was formerly a faculty-in-residence of East Campus.
