= Coxsackie Correctional Facility =

Maximum security state prison in New York, US

Coordinates: 42°20′37″N 73°50′10″W

- Interactive map of Coxsackie Correctional Facility
- Location: 11260 Route 9W, Coxsackie, New York, USA
- Status: Operational
- Security class: Maximum A
- Capacity: Approximately 900
- Opened: 1935
- Managed by: New York State Department of Corrections and Community Supervision

Coxsackie Correctional Facility is a maximum security state prison in Coxsackie, Greene County, New York. It currently houses approximately 900 inmates. It is classified as a maximum security general confinement facility and detention center for men.

== History ==
The prison opened in 1935 as the New York State Vocational Institution, with buildings designed by Alfred Hopkins, an estate architect with a sideline in prisons such as Lewisburg Federal Penitentiary in Pennsylvania. Hopkins had also designed Woodbourne Correctional Facility and Wallkill Correctional Facility for the state. All three were designed on progressive principles, reflected a concern for aesthetics and a sense of places, and had no surrounding walls or fences.

The first inmates received at this institution, generally known as "Coxsackie", were older inmates from the New York House of Refuge which was being closed after serving as a juvenile reformatory since 1825. Coxsackie continued this reformatory function, providing inmates with a program of academic and vocational education. Industrial training is provided in mechanics, machine shop, printing, other trades, and agriculture. For the first ten years of its operation, Coxsackie received inmates by direct commitment from the courts. Since 1945, with the opening of the Elmira Reception Center, Coxsackie has received nearly all its inmates from this center.

== Notable inmates ==
- Rashaun Weaver - Convicted for 14 years to life in prison for the murder of Tessa Majors, along with his friend Luchiano Lewis. Transferred from Great Meadow Correctional Facility after its closure in 2024.
