= Murder of Tessa Majors =

Murder in New York City, US

- Undated photo of Tessa Majors
- Location: 40.8057°N 73.9594°W; Morningside Park, New York City, New York, U.S.
- Date: December 11, 2019 c. 5:30 p.m. (EST)
- Attack type: Murder by stabbing, robbery
- Weapon: Knife
- Victim: Tessa Rane Majors
- Perpetrators: Luchiano Lewis; Rashaun Weaver; Zyairr Davis
- Motive: Robbery
- Verdict: All pleaded guilty
- Convictions: Lewis and Weaver: Second-degree murder; Lewis, Weaver, and Davis: First-degree robbery; Weaver: Second-degree robbery
- Sentence: Lewis: Life imprisonment with the possibility of parole after 9 years Weaver: Life imprisonment with the possibility of parole after 14 years Davis: 18 months in juvenile detention

Tessa Majors was an eighteen-year-old student at Barnard College who was murdered near Morningside Park in Morningside Heights, Manhattan, on December 11, 2019. Majors was attacked and stabbed by three black teenagers as part of a robbery, and was discovered collapsed and bleeding on a staircase exiting Morningside Park and transported to a nearby hospital, ultimately succumbing to the injuries.

One of the suspects, Zyairr Davis, a thirteen-year-old, was arrested the following day and charged with felony murder. Two months later, two fourteen-year-old suspects, Luchiano Lewis (born February 22, 2005) and Rashaun Weaver (born April 3, 2005), both residents of New York City, were also charged with murder. On June 3, 2020, Davis pleaded guilty in family court to robbery in the first degree. On September 21, 2021, Lewis pleaded guilty to second-degree murder and first-degree robbery. In December 2021, Weaver pleaded guilty to second-degree murder, first-degree robbery, and second-degree robbery. Davis was sentenced to 18 months' detention at Horizon Correctional Center in the Bronx, while Lewis was sentenced to nine years to life in prison, and Weaver was sentenced to 14 years to life in prison.

== Background ==
Morningside Park experienced seventeen robberies in the spring of 2019 compared to seven robberies the year before. The suspects in these robberies were mostly juveniles between the ages of twelve and fourteen. The robberies usually involved "the same kids over and over." According to a report, Barnard College was absent from the local crime briefings in the months leading up to Majors's killing though Barnard did receive regular briefings from the New York City Police Department (NYPD) and a safety briefing was part of freshman orientation.

== Murder ==
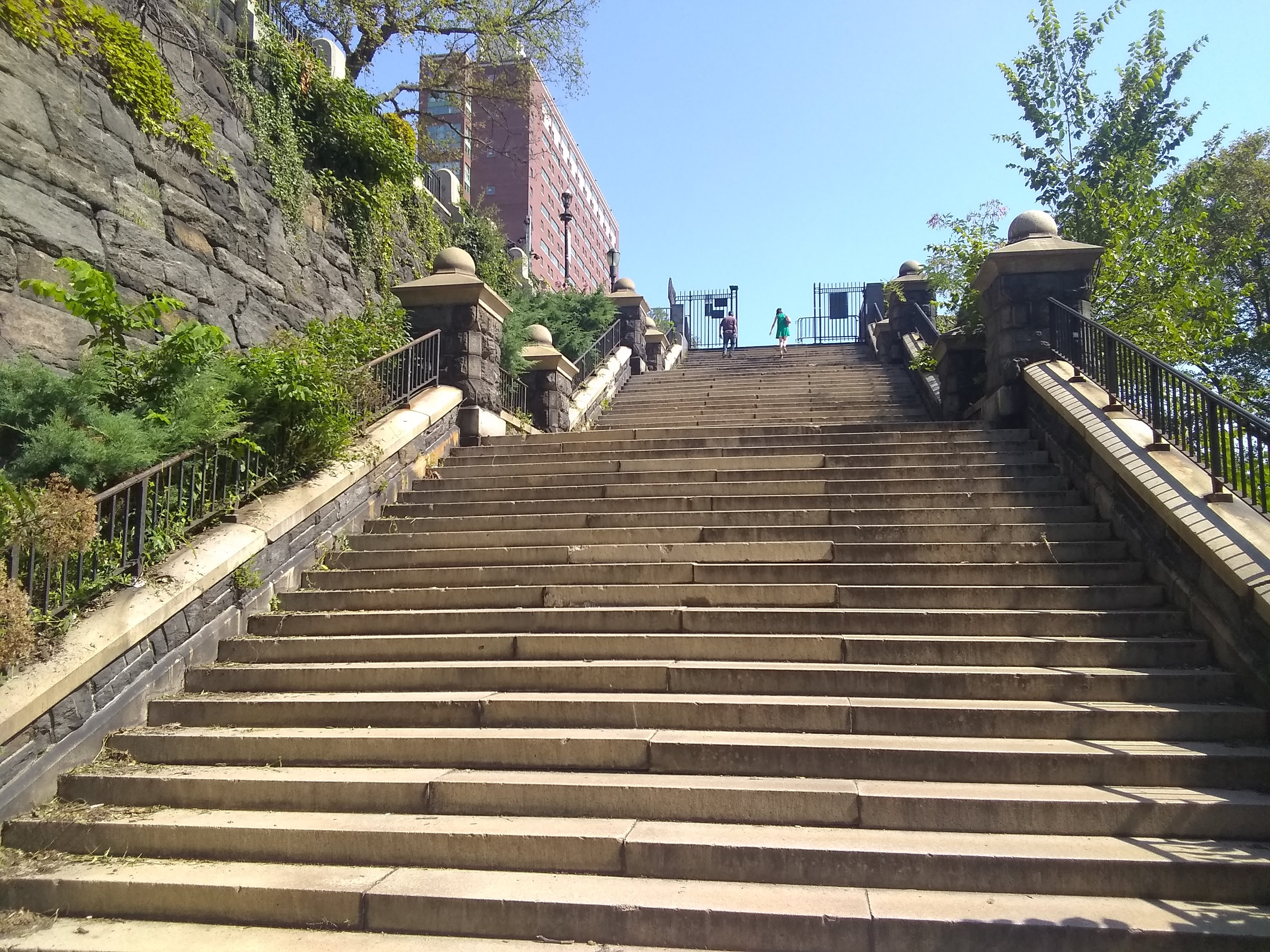
The staircase at 116th Street, near where Majors was found

On December 11, 2019, Majors was walking in Morningside Park, several blocks from Barnard College. Shortly before 7:00 p.m., three people attacked Majors on a staircase near 116th Street and Morningside Drive. Police initially speculated that the attack was a "robbery gone wrong". At a 2021 sentencing hearing for Lewis, Assistant District Attorney Matthew Bogdanos characterized the attack as long, intentional, and pre-meditated.

According to Davis' confession, around dinnertime, the three suspects went to the park to rob people. They considered several potential victims but finally settled on attacking Majors. Davis told police that his two accomplices had grabbed Majors, and used a choke-hold as a restraint while searching for items to take. Majors struggled and refused to hand over a mobile phone. Davis also told police that one of the robbers stabbed Majors with a knife. According to a witness, a male yelled at Majors to give him the phone. Majors then screamed for help, yelling, "Help me! I'm being robbed!"

According to Davis, Majors bit one of the attacker's fingers hard, causing it to bleed. He admitted in his confession that the alleged attacker stabbed Majors after being bitten. The attacker stabbed Majors several times in the chest, with one stab wound piercing the heart.

In a statement read in court during Lewis's guilty plea, Lewis said it was Weaver's idea to commit park robberies but that they did not plan on using a knife. He further stated that Majors was using the phone as he and his co-defendants passed and that Weaver was the first to attack from behind. According to Lewis, Weaver went on to threaten Majors, trying to force Majors to give him money.

After the altercation, the attackers went through Majors's pockets and fled. According to Lewis, after the trio fled, Weaver told him that Majors had bit him. Majors then attempted to climb up the steep stairs found at the park's entrance nearest to the university. Majors staggered up the stairs and collapsed at the corner of Morningside Drive and 116th Street, before being found by a security guard at the top of the staircase. While still conscious, Majors told a witness of the events at the park. Police responded to the attack after a 911 call, finding Majors with multiple stab wounds. Majors was pronounced dead at Mount Sinai Morningside Hospital.

== Investigation and suspects ==
The day after the incident, the police arrested Davis and charged him with felony murder and felony robbery. The suspect was arrested after being caught trespassing while wearing clothes and sneakers that matched the description given of the suspects.

Judge Carol Goldstein set the suspect's trial date for March 16. She also denied requests by his lawyers for him to be released into his aunt and uncle's custody, due to the seriousness of the charges against him. In order to avoid the missteps that occurred during the Central Park Five case 30 years prior, police called in prosecutors early on in the case. Additionally, all questioning of Davis was video recorded.

A second suspect, who was fourteen, was arrested and released on December 12. Police were unable to locate the third suspect, a fourteen-year-old, for two weeks, but apprehended him on December 26 after publicly releasing his photograph. According to The New York Times, detectives believe that some members of the fourteen-year-old's family were hiding him until the bite mark on his hand had time to heal. After being questioned, the boy was released into the custody of his attorneys pending further investigation.

In January 2020, it was announced that the case against the two fourteen-year-old suspects would go before a grand jury. On February 14, 2020, one of the fourteen-year-olds who had been arrested on December 26, was indicted by a grand jury. The New York City Police Department re-arrested him and charged him as an adult with two counts of second-degree murder, one count of first-degree robbery and three counts of second-degree robbery. According to a criminal complaint, DNA belonging to this suspect was found under Majors's fingernails. The suspect allegedly confessed to his incarcerated father during a recorded phone conversation. According to court papers, the suspect stated that he tried to get Majors's phone coercively.

In February, another suspect, aged fourteen, was arrested. He was charged as an adult with a count of second degree murder, two counts of first-degree robbery and one count of second-degree robbery. Both fourteen-year-old suspects were arraigned on February 19 and pleaded not guilty.

On June 3, 2020, Davis, who had since turned 14, pleaded guilty in family court to robbery in the first degree. Police investigation of surveillance footage had shown that this juvenile, the youngest of the three in the group, had not touched Majors during the crime, which the prosecutor said had contributed, along with his young age and clean record, to their decision to drop the murder charge if the boy pleaded guilty to the robbery. On June 15 he was sentenced to eighteen months in detention. Though Majors's parents were not present at the sentencing, they submitted a victim impact statement which was read in court. In the statement, they criticized the deal that led to the offender's guilty plea and argued that he "has shown a complete lack of remorse or contrition for his role in the killing of Tess Majors." They also criticized the offender's choice to pick up the knife and handing it to the person who stabbed Majors with it.

On September 21, 2021, Lewis pleaded guilty to second-degree murder and first-degree robbery. The news was welcomed by Majors's family who thanked the authorities for their work in this case. On October 14, 2021, Lewis was sentenced to the maximum of nine years to life in prison. The judge sentenced Lewis to an additional three-plus years for the robbery. During his time in custody, Lewis has been involved in multiple fights and had contraband that could have been used as weapons. He was also re-arrested for felony assault after a violent slashing with another inmate over a blanket. He is currently imprisoned in the Franklin Correctional Facility.

On December 16, 2021, Weaver pleaded guilty to one count of second-degree murder, one count of first-degree robbery, and one count of second-degree robbery. At the plea hearing, Weaver acknowledged that he "intentionally caused the death of Tessa Majors by stabbing her with a knife." He was sentenced to 14 years to life in prison on January 19, 2022. He is currently imprisoned in the Lakeview Shock Incarceration Correctional Facility.

== Victim ==
Tessa Rane Majors (May 11, 2001 – December 11, 2019), also known as Tess, was from Charlottesville, Virginia. Majors graduated from St. Anne's-Belfield School in May 2019, and was a first-semester freshman at Barnard College, a private all-women's school in Manhattan. Majors sang and played bass in a band, Patient 0, which had recently released an album. The band had played its first gig in New York City that fall and was scheduled to play two more shows in Charlottesville during winter break. Majors also led the creative writing club in high school, ran cross-country, and volunteered on political campaigns. An intern at the Augusta Free Press during the spring of 2019, Majors had an interest in journalism and planned to study journalism in college. Majors's father is an English professor at James Madison University, and the author of six books.

== Aftermath ==
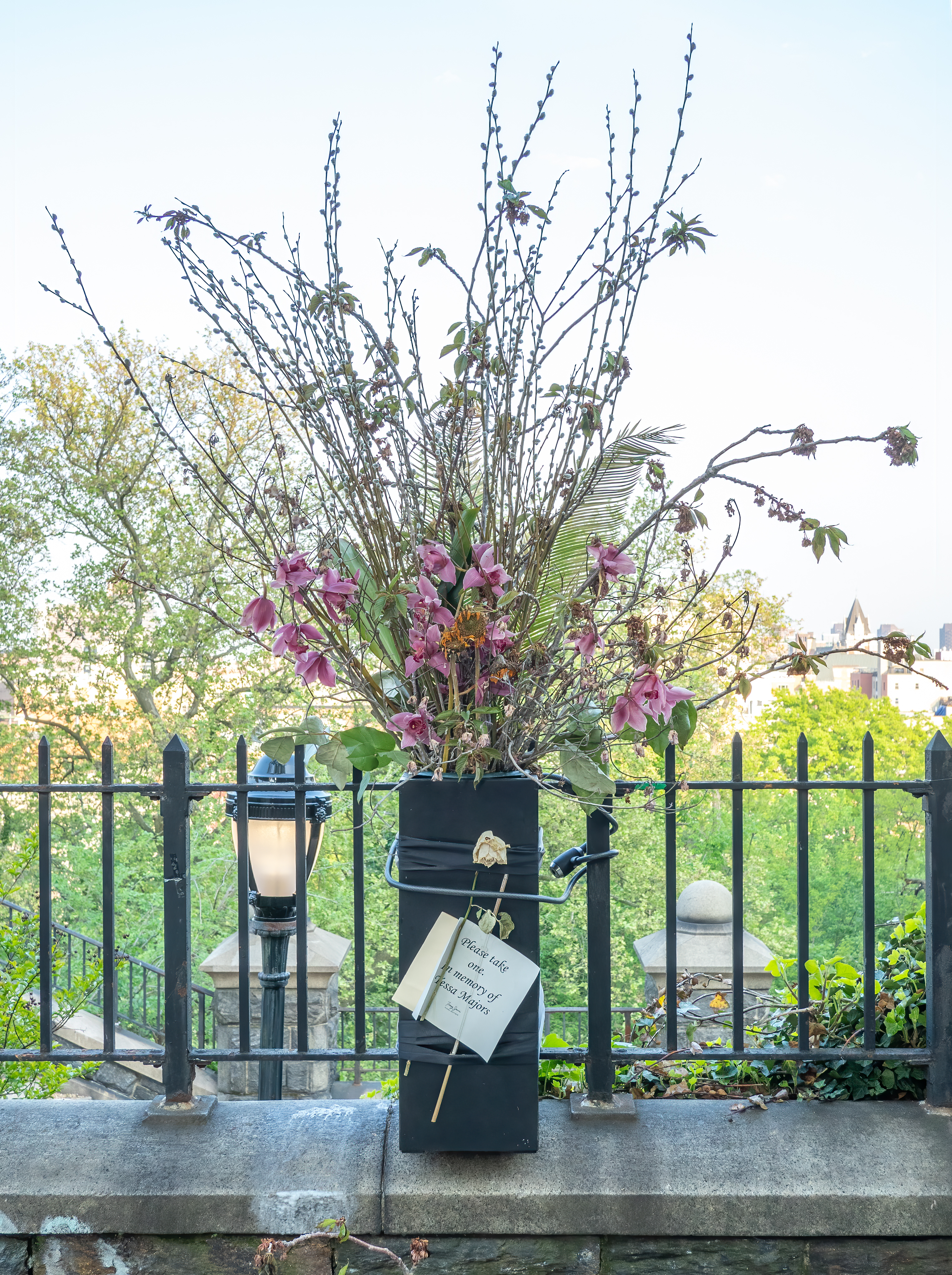
Memorial along a park fence on Morningside Drive in May 2021

The attack prompted new security measures at Morningside Park, including 24-hour guard booths outside the park. The operational hours of the evening safety shuttle bus were also extended. Additional funding was promised for security measures at Morningside Park, as well as fixing the outdoor lighting. NYPD committed additional officers for patrolling the park, and Columbia University pledged more security guards. New York City Council member Mark D. Levine announced he was attempting to get funds to add security cameras that could be monitored in real time by police officers.

== Reaction ==
The murder of Majors garnered considerable news coverage and was called a political football, in part because violent crime had fallen significantly in New York City in preceding years.

The case was particularly notable for the young ages of the suspects; juveniles under the age of fifteen account for only a small fraction (significantly less than 1%) of those arrested for murder each year. In addition, since the suspects were black and the victim was white, the murder is reported to have "resurfaced the longstanding racial and class tensions between Columbia University and the fast-gentrifying neighborhood of Harlem."

The New York Times has compared the case to the 1989 Central Park jogger case, which occurred nearby in the North Woods of Central Park; both cases involved a young female victim and alleged young male perpetrators, although the suspects of the 1989 case had their charges vacated. This comparison to the jogger case was echoed by Time and the Star Tribune. Gale Brewer, the borough president of Manhattan, urged detectives to proceed with caution to avoid an outcome similar to the jogger case. In an effort to avoid the mistakes made by police 30 years prior, all questioning of the suspects in the Tessa Majors case was video recorded. New York magazine called it a defining, once-in-a-generation crime for New Yorkers.

The press remarked that the Morningside Park area continued to raise safety concerns when a murder similar to that of Majors occurred there December 2, 2021, when Davide Giri was fatally stabbed; the New York Times called it "an eerie reprise."

Lewis was paroled October 14. 2026.

== See also ==
- Killing of Iryna Zarutska
