= Carl Schurz Memorial =

Monument to Carl Schurz

Coordinates: 40°48′22″N 73°57′33″W

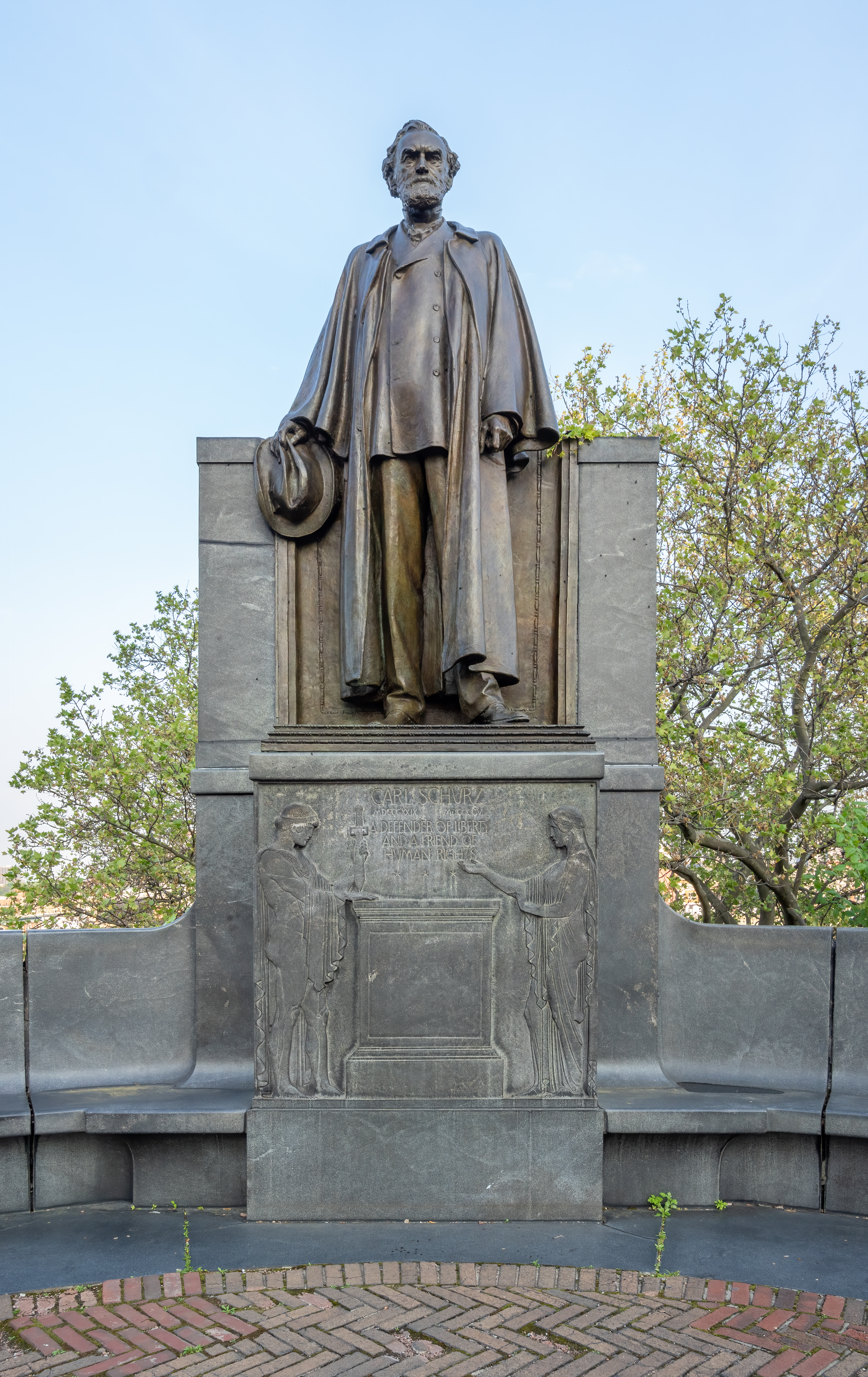
Statue of Carl Schurz

The Carl Schurz Memorial, constructed in 1913, is a bronze statue of Carl Schurz (1829–1906) and a surrounding granite exedra. Carl Schurz was a German-American revolutionary, statesman, journalist, and reformer, who was a general during the American Civil War and a politician thereafter. The memorial is in Morningside Park at the junction of Morningside Drive and 116th Street in New York City.

== History and description ==
The idea for the memorial was conceived following Schurz’s death in 1906, when lawyer Joseph H. Choate formed a memorial committee and succeeded in raising $93,000 in donations. The resulting monument was a collaboration between Austrian sculptor Karl Bitter (1867–1915) and architect Henry Bacon (1866–1924). Bitter was selected in 1908 for the project after completing public commissions for works such as the Franz Sigel statue (1907) on Riverside Drive, and the maquette for the figure of Pomona on top of the Pulitzer Fountain in Grand Army Plaza, near Midtown Manhattan. Bacon was recruited by Bitter to assist in the monument’s design; he would go on to design the Lincoln Memorial in Washington D.C.

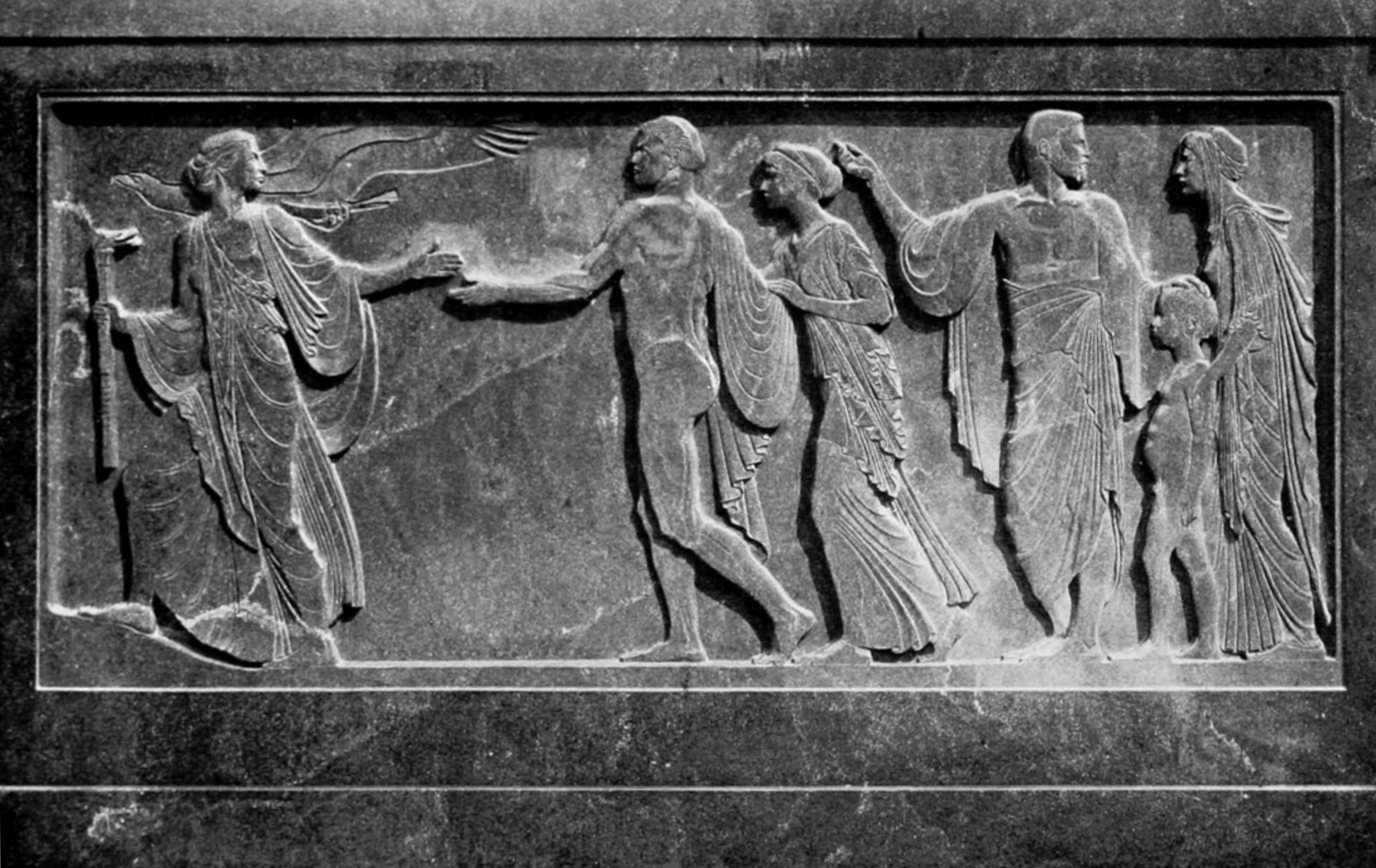
Left Panel

Bitter believed that although exhibition works “may appeal to the tastes of the day”, “monuments must show larger and deeper roots of thought and execution”. He held this principle in mind when designing the Carl Schurz Memorial, demonstrating his skill at combining sculpture and architecture with both beauty and functionality in mind. Both Bitter and Bacon utilized the Beaux-Arts style, named for the École des Beaux-Arts in France where it was created. The style is characterized by symmetry, classical references, and ornamentation, which can be noted throughout the Schurz Memorial.

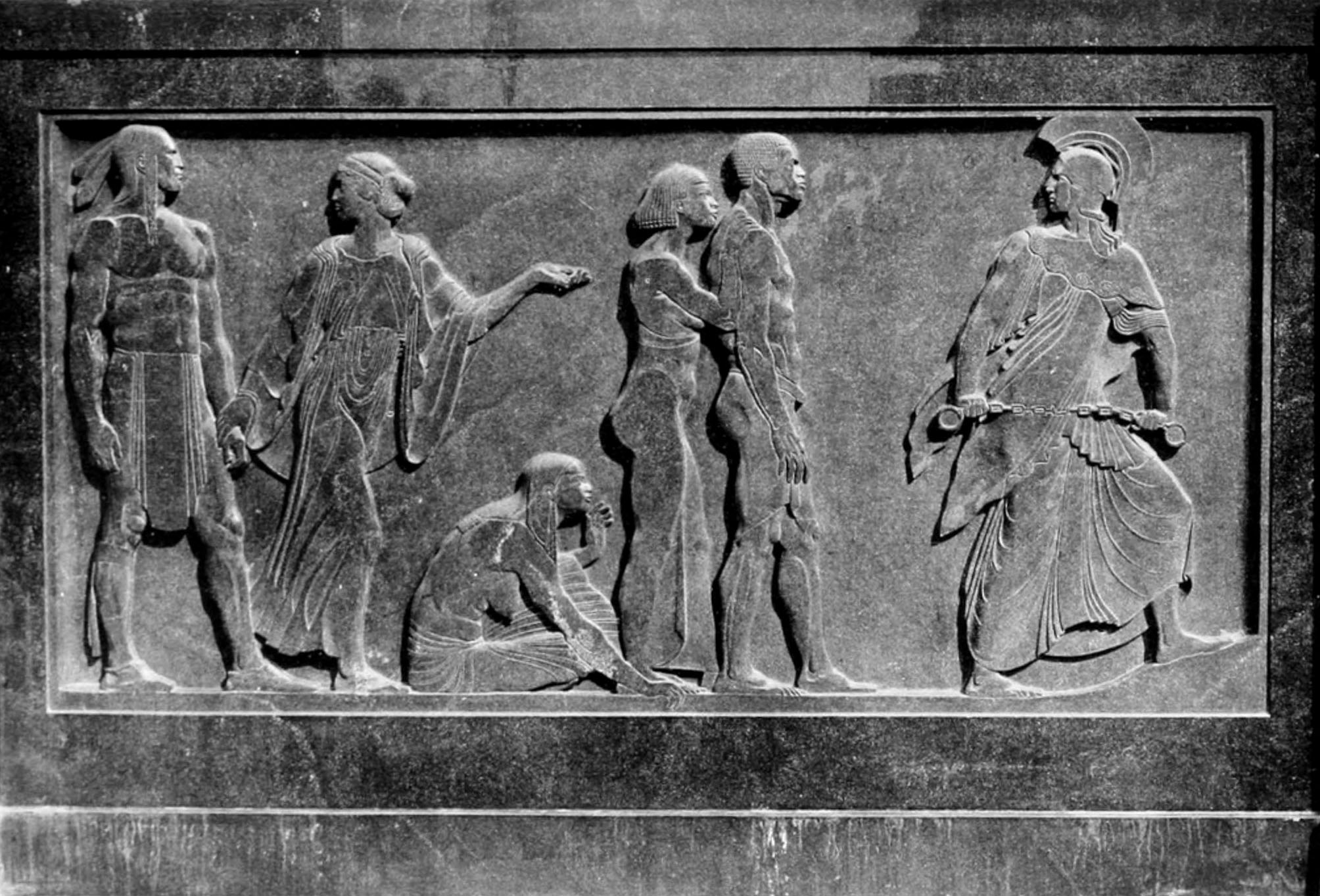
Right Panel

The monument consists of a full-standing bronze portrait statue of Schurz, crafted by Bitter from a death mask, photographs, and his own recollection of the deceased. The statue is placed in the middle of a granite exedra, otherwise known as a curved bench, which includes carved reliefs that were originally framed by two bronze luminaries. The granite carvings were sculpted by the Bronx-based Piccirilli studios after clay and plaster models crafted by Bitter, and the bronze elements were cast by Brooklyn-based Jno. Williams Inc. Foundry. These reliefs display the influence of Greek archaic sculpture, which can be directly correlated to Bitter’s travels to Vienna in 1909 and 1910 which exposed him to Secessionist art, and his trip to Greece in 1910. Studio assistants of Bitter may have worked on the design of the relief carvings, which reflect Schurz’s social concerns about enslaved African Americans and Native Americans.

== Conservation and restoration ==
After several decades the monument fell into disrepair. It underwent conservation and restoration in the late 1930s. At this time the bronze lettering was replaced by incised inscriptions and the original light poles were replaced with simpler ones. In 2003, after renovations to Morningside Park, Parks’ Citywide Monuments Conservation Program conserved the statue and reliefs. The inscriptions include his name and the roman numerals MDCCCXXIX for his birth year of 1929, and MDCCCCV for a death year of 1905 – contrary to the 1906 of trustworthy sources. Beneath these years is inscribed “A Defender of Liberty and a Friend of Human Rights.”
