= New York House of Refuge =

First juvenile reformatory in the US

Coordinates: 40.795°N 73.923°W

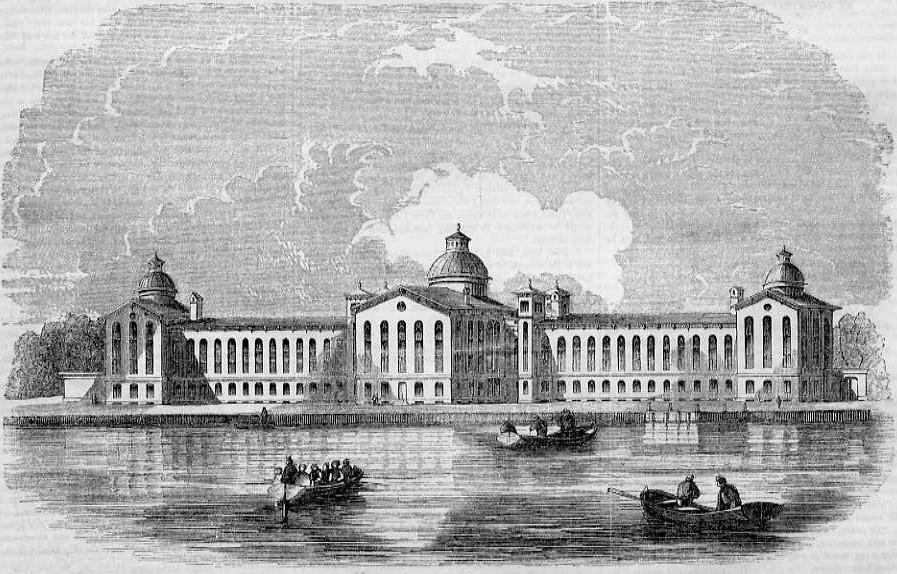
A wood engraving representing the NY House of Refuge in 1855

The New York House of Refuge was the first juvenile reformatory established in the United States. It opened in 1824 on the Bowery in Manhattan, New York City and was destroyed by a fire in 1839, before being relocated first to Twenty-Third Street and then, in 1854, to Randalls Island.

Through its 111-year history, the reformatory was privately funded, receiving only guidance, supervision and additional funding from state agencies.

Beginning in 1901, female inmates were removed to the newly opened New York State Reformatory for Women, now the Taconic Correctional Facility. In the 1930s, younger male inmates (ages 12 to 15) were transferred to the new state training school at Warwick, and the older boys to the newly constructed state prison in Coxsackie. The House of Refuge closed on May 11, 1935.

== In popular culture ==
The House of Refuge (referred to as simply the Refuge in the film) was depicted in the 1992 film Newsies and the musical theater adaptation of the same name.
