= Gwathmey Siegel & Associates Architects =

Gwathmey Siegel Kaufman & Associates Architects LLC
- Formerly: Gwathmey Siegel & Associates Architects
- Type: Architecture firm
- Founded: 1967
- Headquarters: New York City, United States
- Key people: Charles Gwathmey, Robert Siegel, Gene Kaufman
- Website: www.gwathmey-siegel.com

Gwathmey Siegel Kaufman & Associates Architects LLC (formerly Gwathmey Siegel & Associates Architects) is a New York City-based architectural firm founded in 1967 by architects Charles Gwathmey and Robert Siegel.

The firm's work ranges from art and educational facilities and major corporate buildings to furniture systems and decorative art objects. Critics view Gwathmey Siegel's work as the stylistic successors of the formal modernism of Swiss architect Le Corbusier. The firm is especially well known for its residential architecture having designed houses for famous clients such as Steven Spielberg, David Geffen, and Ronald Lauder. The architecture critic, Paul Goldberger, writing in 2005, described their houses as "expertly crafted, staggeringly expensive, and not particularly avant-garde."

== History ==
Gwathmey and Siegel met while students at The High School of Music & Art in New York City in the 1950s.

The firm designed place settings for American Airlines.

Gene Kaufman joined the firm as partner soon after Charles Gwathmey died of cancer in August 2009. He acquired a majority share and his name was added to the firm.

Archives from the firm were donated to Yale in 2010.

== Selected works ==
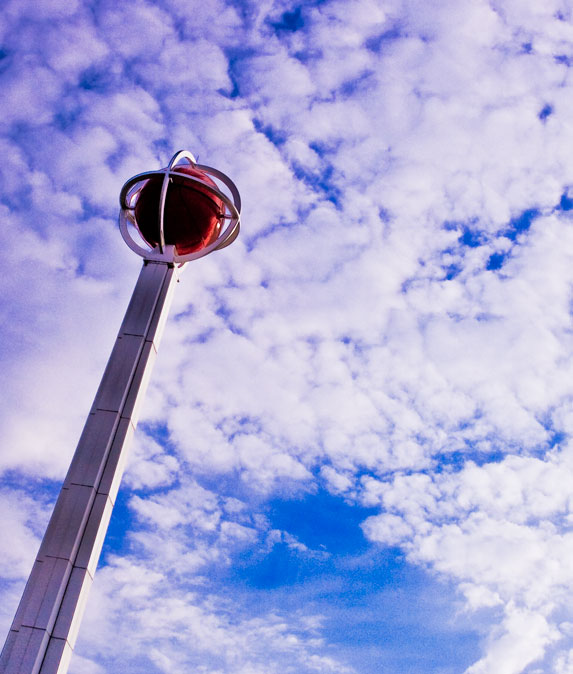
Basketball in the sky above the Naismith Memorial Basketball Hall of Fame

- Henry Art Gallery (1979)
- East Campus (Columbia University) (1982); the facade had significantly deteriorated by 1991.
- 1585 Broadway (1990)
- Solomon R. Guggenheim Museum (adjoining structure, 1992)
- Museum of Contemporary Art, North Miami (1996)
- Naismith Memorial Basketball Hall of Fame (2003)
- 445 Lafayette Street, New York (2004)
- Burchfield-Penney Art Center (2008)
- Yale Art and Architecture Building (renovation & adjoining structure, 2008)
- 400 Fifth Avenue (2010)
- Crocker Art Museum (2010)
- United States Mission to the United Nations
- 90 Columbus, Jersey City
