= Morningside Park (Manhattan) =

Public park in Manhattan, New York

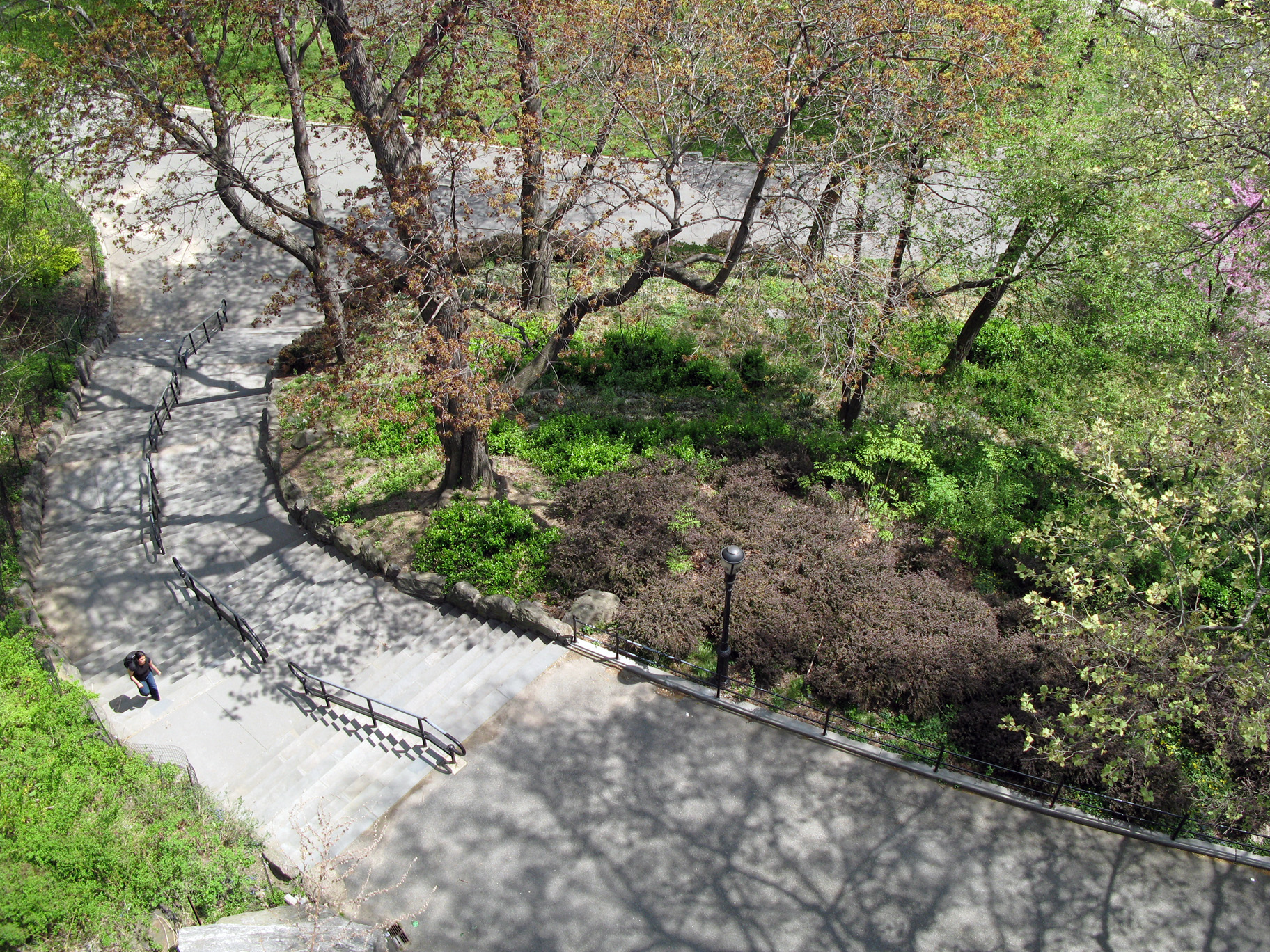
- Interactive map of Morningside Park
- Type: Urban park
- Location: Between 110th and 123rd Streets; Manhattan, New York, U.S.
- Nearest city: New York City
- Coordinates: 40°48′23″N 73°57′29″W
- Area: 30 acres (12 ha)
- Created: 1895
- Operator: New York City Department of Parks and Recreation
- Status: Open year-round
- Public transit: Subway: to Cathedral Parkway–110th Street or 116th Street; Bus: M3, M4, M7, M10, M11, M116

Morningside Park is a 30-acre (12-hectare) public park in Upper Manhattan in New York City, New York, United States. The park is bounded by 110th Street to the south, 123rd Street to the north, Morningside Avenue to the east, and Morningside Drive to the west. A cliff made of Manhattan schist runs through the park and separates Morningside Heights, above the cliff to the west, from Harlem. The park includes other rock outcroppings; a human-made ornamental pond and waterfall; three sculptures; several athletic fields; playgrounds; and an arboretum. Morningside Park is operated by the New York City Department of Parks and Recreation, although the group Friends of Morningside Park helps maintain it.

The area near Morningside Park was originally known as Muscota by the Lenape Native Americans in the Delaware languages. A park in this location was first proposed by the Central Park commissioners in 1867, and the city commissioned Central Park's designers Frederick Law Olmsted and Calvert Vaux to produce a design for the park in 1873. Jacob Wrey Mould was hired to design new plans in 1880, but little progress occurred until Olmsted and Vaux were asked to modify the plans following Mould's death in 1886. The Lafayette and Washington, Carl Schurz Monument, and Seligman Fountain sculptures were installed after the park was completed in 1895.

After a period of neglect in the early 20th century, the park received sporting fields and playgrounds between the 1930s and the 1950s. Columbia University proposed constructing a gym in the southern end of the park in the early 1960s; the plan was abandoned after students organized protests against the gym in 1968, citing concerns over racial segregation. In the late 20th century, Morningside Park gained a reputation for high crime rates, and several groups devised plans to renovate the park. The site of the unbuilt Columbia gym was turned into a waterfall and pond in 1990, and the park's arboretum was added in 1998. The New York City Landmarks Preservation Commission designated Morningside Park as a scenic landmark in 2008.

== History ==
=== Site ===
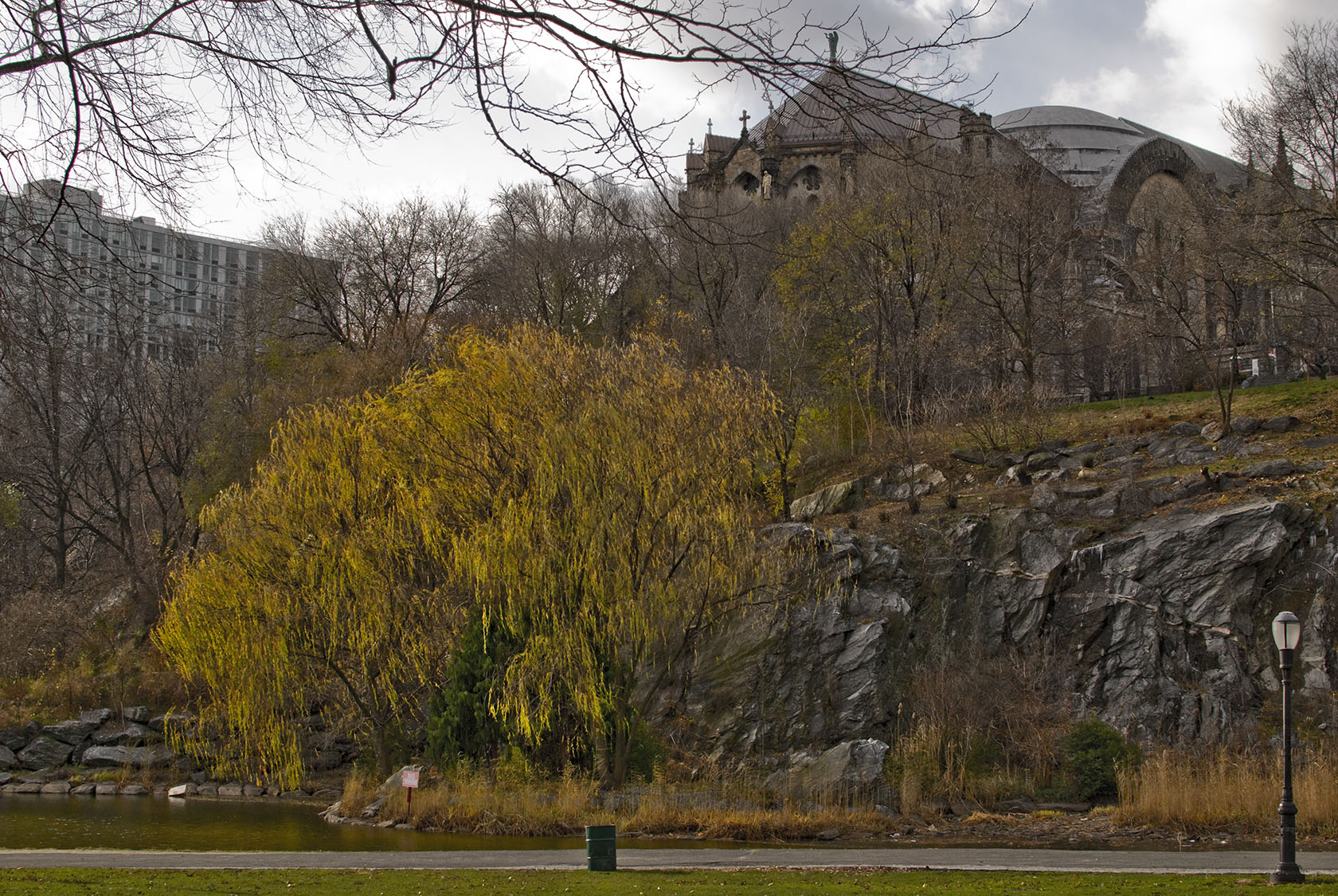
Morningside Park's distinctive cliff of Manhattan schist. The Cathedral of St. John the Divine is atop the cliff, and the park's pond is at left.

Morningside Park straddles the more-than-100-foot (30 m) cliff between the high terrain of Morningside Heights to the west and the lowlands of Harlem to the east. The cliff was created through fault movement and smoothed during several glacial periods in the last several million years. Before the 17th century, when modern-day Manhattan was settled by Europeans, the region had been occupied by the Lenape Native Americans for several thousand years. The Lenape referred to the area near the park as Muscota or Muscoota, meaning 'place of rushes'.

Dutch settlers occupied Manhattan in the early 17th century and called the area around Morningside Park Vredendal, meaning 'peaceful dale'. The lowlands to the east were called Flacken by the Dutch, and were later translated to "Flats" in English. The land to the east was not settled initially because of its marshy topography. The area became known as Montagne's (or Montayne's) Flat after Johannes de la Montagne, who was among the first European settlers of New Harlem in 1658; he owned about 200 acres (81 ha) between what is now 109th and 124th Streets. The western boundary of the area was the cliff, while the eastern boundary was a creek that emptied east into the East River. (Note: Part of this creek in modern Central Park, dubbed Montayne's Rivulet, was also named after de la Montagne.) Montagne's Flat was subdivided into lots in 1662, and four years later a new charter for New Harlem was given to the English, who had seized New Netherland, renaming it New York. Through the 17th and 18th centuries, the cliff formed a geopolitical boundary between Harlem to the east and the heights to the west.

The western boundary of New Harlem was drawn through the present-day Morningside Park in 1666, running from 74th Street at the East River to 124th Street at the North River (now the Hudson River). To the west of the line were the common lands of the Province of New York, which were sold to Jacob De Key in 1701. Following Harman Vandewater's acquisition of part of the De Key farm by 1735, it was called Vandewater Heights by 1738. Vandewater Heights would then be sold by 1785 to James W. De Peyster. There were disputes over the De Key farm throughout the 18th century, disputes which eventually resulted in the cliffside's being named as the farm's eastern boundary. Meanwhile, Montagne's Flat was owned by several families in the 17th and 18th centuries, some of whom were slaveholders, according to censuses taken in 1790, 1800, and 1810. British Army colonial forces used a road on the farm to retreat during the September 16, 1776, Battle of Harlem Heights, one of the battles of the American Revolutionary War.

In the Commissioners' Plan of 1811, which laid out a grid system for Manhattan island, little regard was given to the topography of the area. Shortly afterward, during the War of 1812, several blockhouse fortifications were built in the area. The first such fort was built in what is now Central Park, and three other blockhouses numbered 2, 3, and 4 were erected within present-day Morningside Park. The blockhouses at Morningside Park were along the cliff and were numbered from north to south: No. 2 at 113th–114th Streets, No. 3 at 121st Street, and No. 4 at 123rd Street. These would not be used in battle and were left to deteriorate. Morningside Heights would remain sparsely developed for the next half-century except for the Bloomingdale Insane Asylum and the Leake and Watts Orphan Asylum.

=== Design and construction ===
==== Initial plans ====
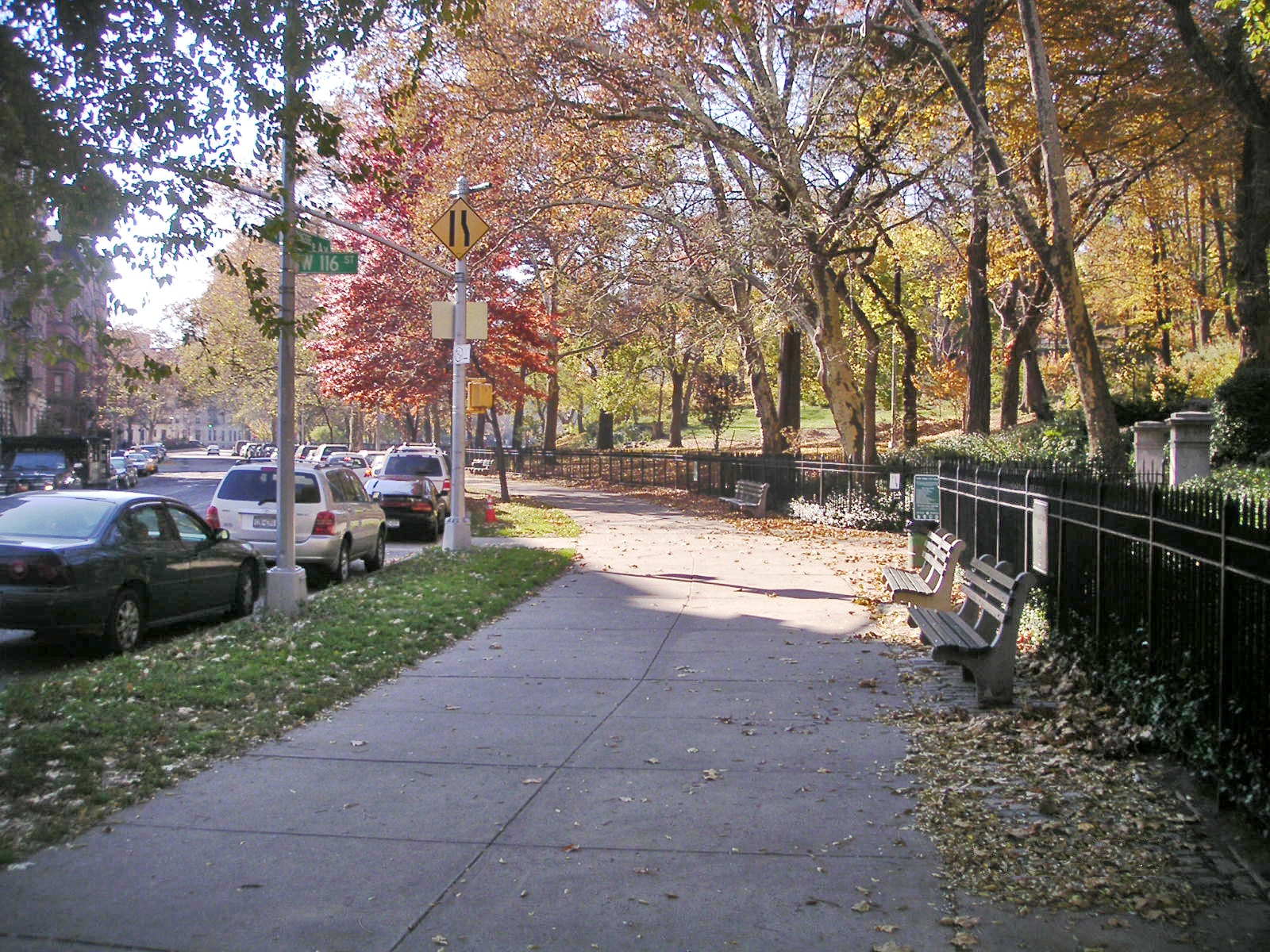
Morningside Avenue runs along the edge of the park in Harlem

By 1866, the state legislature had given the Central Park commissioners the authority to construct streets on Manhattan's west side from 67th to 155th Streets. In 1867, lead Central Park commissioner Andrew Haswell Green proposed that a park be built in Morningside Heights to avoid the expense of expanding the Manhattan street grid across extremely steep terrain. Green enclosed a map by John J. Serrell that modified the Commissioners' Plan to this extent. The Central Park commissioners passed an act on March 26, 1868, allowing the acquisition of lands for parks. Under this act, the commissioners purchased 31.238 acres (12.642 ha), and seized another 0.018 acres (73 m^{2}) through eminent domain, at a total cost of US$1.33 million.

In April 1870, the Central Park commission was dissolved and the City of New York obtained jurisdiction over the property. That September, Department of Public Parks (DPP) chief engineer Montgomery A. Kellogg was asked to create a plan for Morningside Park. Over the next year, the city would spend $5,500 to conduct surveys of the proposed parkland. Kellogg presented a design for the park in October 1871. The New York Times said that the park's name was apt for it would "[possess] a sunny exposure in the early morning hours," and described the planned park as having "handsome walks, flower-beds, jetting fountains, [and] a play-ground" among other things. The Times predicted that the planned Morningside Park "will doubtless be a favorite resort for children and invalids." Kellogg's plan was rejected by the Board of Commissioners for Public Parks.

In April 1872, the DPP created a committee to discuss possible upgrades to the street to the park's west side, and Frederick Law Olmsted and Calvert Vaux, who had designed Central Park's Greensward Plan, were commissioned to produce a design for the park. In a September 1872 article, the Times predicted that the construction of Morningside Park and its proximity to Broadway and Central Park would raise property values nearby. Talk of a preliminary study and map began circulating in March 1873. By that September, Olmsted was assigned to work exclusively on Morningside Park, and he was dropped from his position as superintendent of other parks. Olmsted and Vaux presented their plan, "A Preliminary Report on the Improvement of Morningside Park", to the DPP on October 11, 1873. Because of the limitations of the terrain, the proposed design would emphasize scenery, with balconies, a planted lagoon, a lawn at the north end of the park, and a retaining wall with stairways. The design also took into consideration the site's proximity to Central Park, one block away from the southern end of the proposed Morningside Park. The work would cost about $816,000. Five days after the plan was presented, the DPP approved it "in principle".

==== Beginning of construction ====
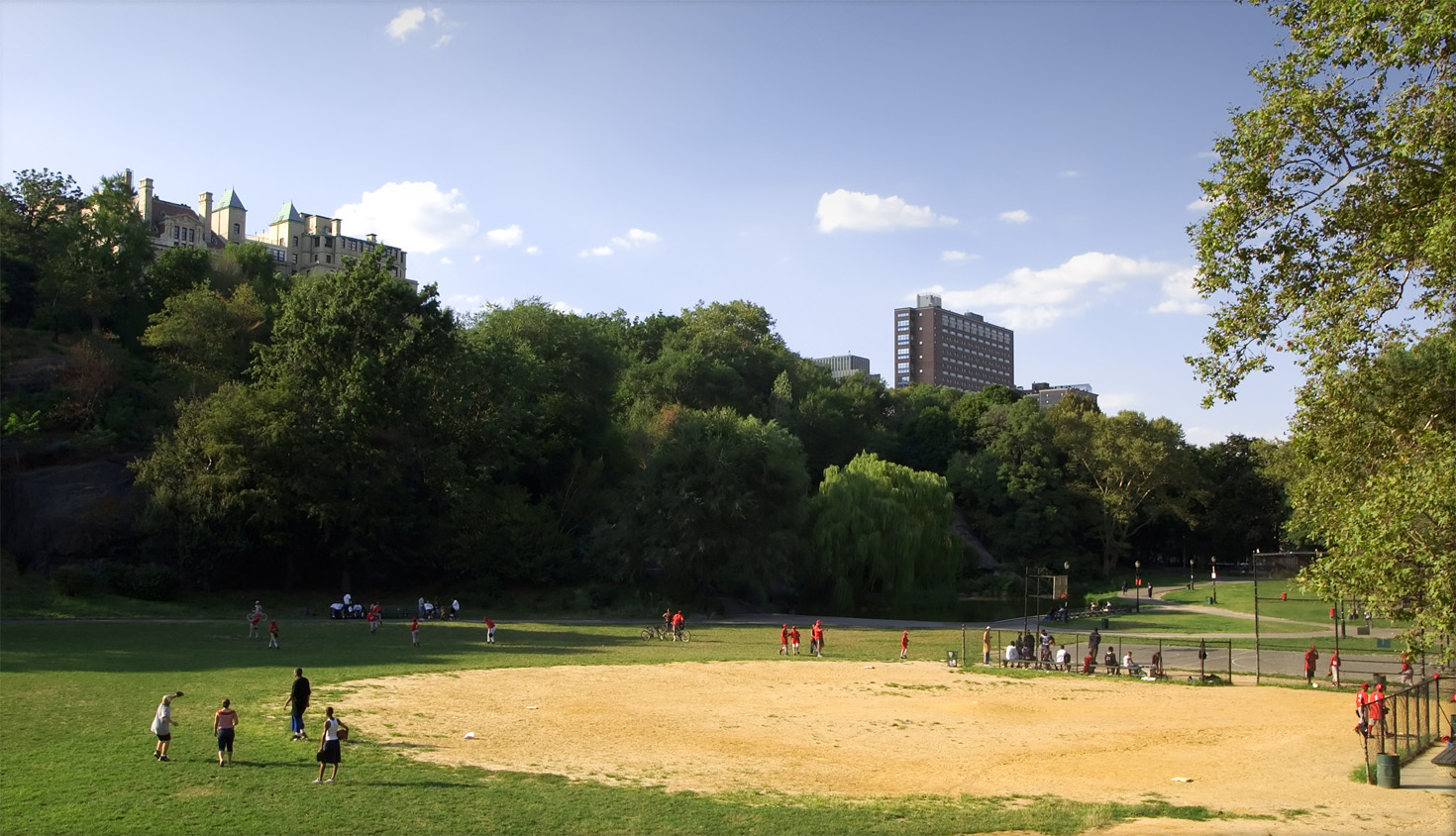
Morningside Park's play fields

Owing to several factors, including work stoppages following the economic depression after the Panic of 1873, construction on Morningside Park stagnated for 14 years. Nevertheless, work began in 1873, construction progressing on the walks and perimeter walls, as well as on the sewers and lagoon. When work was halted in October 1874, the sewer, pond, walks, and embankments were under construction. A Times article in April 1875 noted that the city's Department of Public Works was laying roads and sidewalks west and east of the park.

Little work was performed in the next five years, except for the construction of roads. On June 16, 1880, the Legislature passed a law allowing the city's Department of Public Works to finish the roads, sidewalks, and retaining walls near Morningside Park. That September, the Legislature appointed Jacob Wrey Mould, who had previously been involved in Central Park's design, as the new architect of Morningside Park. Mould submitted a plan for the streets in April 1881. The proposal, which was to cost $234,000, called for eleven entrances; granite stairs; a retaining wall at Morningside Drive, made of gneiss and ashlar; overlook balconies; and railings of granite and cast-and wrought-iron. The plans were approved in August 1881. Mould's final plans for the western side of the park were submitted in September 1882 and plans for the northern, eastern, and southern sides were approved the next month.

In January 1883, Julius Munckwitz was asked to create plans for Morningside Park, and Mould was named as his assistant. After Munckwitz's plans were submitted that March, Montgomery A. Kellogg – the DPP chief engineer who had been promoted to engineer of construction – worked on completing the measurements. Contracts for the foundations were awarded in April, while contracts for the western side's entrances and overlooks were awarded to Charles Jones that July. Jones began work on the western border in November 1883 and completed his contract nearly a year later. Meanwhile, in January 1884, Munckwitz began preparing plans for the western steps and entrances, which were approved that October. The Times reported in December 1884 that over $71,000 was needed for the park. Though Munckwitz quit the DPP in mid-1885, he continued working with the project as a consultant.

By February 1885, the stairways on the western border at 110th, 116th, and 120th Streets were being built. That May, Michael McGrath won a contract to build granite steps, brick arches, and other ornamentation at the 110th and 116th Street entrances on the western border and at four intermediate overlook bays. The park was still in a rural state, as indicated in the Times that same year, which reported that police were capturing cows for illegally grazing in the park and fining local dairymen for pasturing their herds. Following this, the DPP ordered that all signs and other "defacements" be removed from the park site. By mid-1886, several local entities were expressing frustration at the lack of progress at Morningside Park. For instance, the Morningside Park Association twice requested that action be taken to complete the park. After Mould died in 1886, the DPP needed to hire a new architect for Morningside Park. Kellogg submitted new plans for $250,000 worth of park improvements in February 1887, at which point the Times reported that only the 116th Street staircase and part of the retaining wall had been completed over the previous fourteen years. These plans were ultimately approved.

==== Final plans and completion ====
In June 1887, the DPP asked Olmsted to create informal plans for Central, Morningside, and Riverside Parks. In response, Olmsted said he would do so only if Vaux was also hired. Ultimately, Olmsted's proposal was voted down, and Kellogg and city parks superintendent Samuel Parsons were asked to report on Olmsted and Vaux's original plan instead. In July, a group of Civil War veterans stayed in the park during the Independence Day weekend, hosting a historical reenactment in which they fired cannons and pretended to storm the blockhouse walls. Though Parsons and Kellogg presented their proposed changes in August 1887, which they believed were feasible with the available $250,000 appropriation, local property owners asked that the original plan be used instead. Later that month, the board voted to let Olmsted and Vaux work on the plan.

The plan was modified to accommodate changed conditions, like the construction of an elevated railway station at 116th Street and Eighth Avenue. Among other changes, the modified design included a broad path and a thin path traversing the lower portion of the park. Initially, Olmsted and Vaux had proposed a southeastern entrance plaza, a lagoon, and an exhibition hall; the modified design eliminated these, while adding a lawn and a "Restawhile" recreation structure. Olmsted and Vaux had differing visions for Morningside Park: Olmsted believed the area should be kept naturalistic, and advocated the removal of all except one east–west path, while Vaux did not believe that paths would negatively affect the park's purpose. The "General Plan for the Improvement of Morningside Park" was approved by the DPP in October 1887, and a request for $250,000 in bonds was approved by the Board of Estimate the following month.

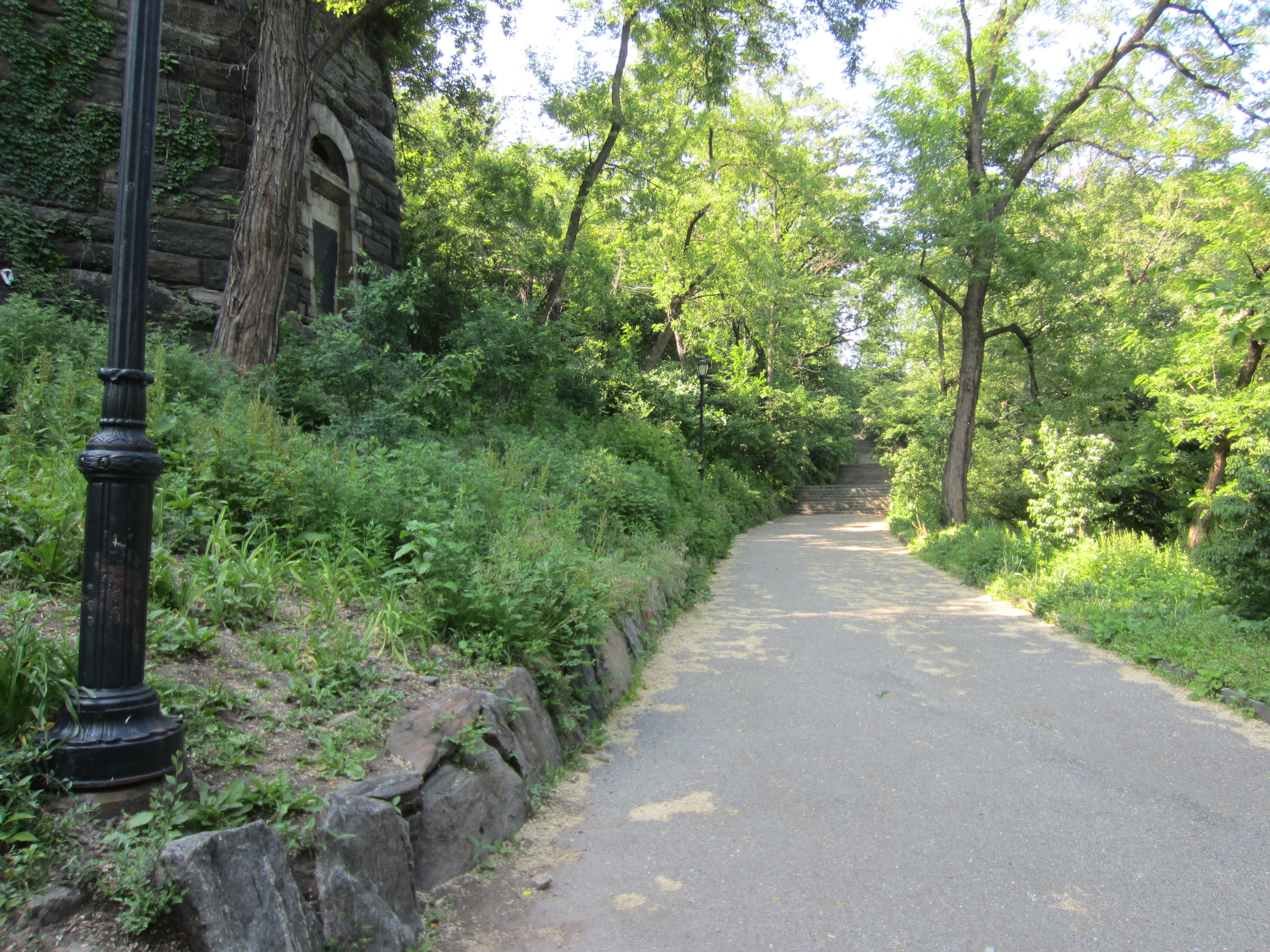
One of the paths in Morningside Park, which was constructed during the late 19th century

In mid-1888, contracts were awarded for earth and rock filling, and for the construction of basins, walls, and stairs in the southern portion of the park. Vaux suggested widening the roadbed and narrowing the eastern sidewalk of Morningside Drive, on the western side of the park. Further appropriations of $50,000 each were requested in September 1888 and March 1889. Subsequently, Vaux's suggestion to modify Morningside Drive was approved in July 1889, as was Kellogg's request for asphalt, concrete, and gravel for pavings. That September, the DPP voted to proceed with the completion of stairs and overlooks at Morningside Avenue north of 117th Street, in the same design as those built previously. Stairs and walls were finished that December. Further plans, approved in early 1890, called for the completion of the western entrances and overlooks, and the installation of railings and ornamentation. By December 1890, the Real Estate Record and Builders Guide reported that the work was almost done. The Guide said of the park, "It is not very wide, but it is some three-quarters of a mile in length. It has hills and dales and green swards, which, with its imposing terraces, make it peculiarly attractive." Morningside Park was even considered briefly for the World's Columbian Exposition of 1893, which ultimately occurred in Chicago.

Plans for walls and railings at 110th Street (the southern border) and Morningside Drive (the western border) were approved in October 1890, followed by the awarding of a contract for them in February 1892. Because of delays in constructing the steps, two time extensions were awarded in August and October 1891. Meanwhile, pavings were completed in May 1891 and the parapets were finished the following December. By June 1894, parks superintendent Parsons had noted that parts of the park were nearly completed. That October, contracts were awarded for the paving of sidewalks. The park's construction was completed in 1895. Vaux, who had remained with the project throughout that time as a consultant, drowned that year in Gravesend Bay. Parsons later wrote that "...perhaps Morningside Park was the most consummate piece of art that [Vaux] had ever created."

The completion of Morningside Park was concurrent with the development of nearby Morningside Heights; the park's construction had necessarily resulted in the creation of the neighborhood's street grid, and several institutions relocated to the area. The first of these included the Cathedral of St. John the Divine whose construction began in 1892 (Note: Though the Cathedral of St. John the Divine's construction started in 1892, construction had proceeded extremely slowly and several parts have never been completed.) on the site of the Leake and Watts Orphan Asylum. The Bloomingside Asylum moved out of the area in 1888 after protests over the asylum's presence, and three colleges moved to the site: Columbia College (now part of Columbia University), Teachers College, and Barnard College. Other institutions that moved to Morningside Heights following the park's completion included: St. Luke's Hospital, the former Home for Old Men and Aged Couples; St. Luke's Home for Indigent Christian Females; the former Woman's Hospital; Union Theological Seminary; and the Church of Notre Dame (L'Eglise de Notre Dame).

=== Early and mid-20th centuries ===
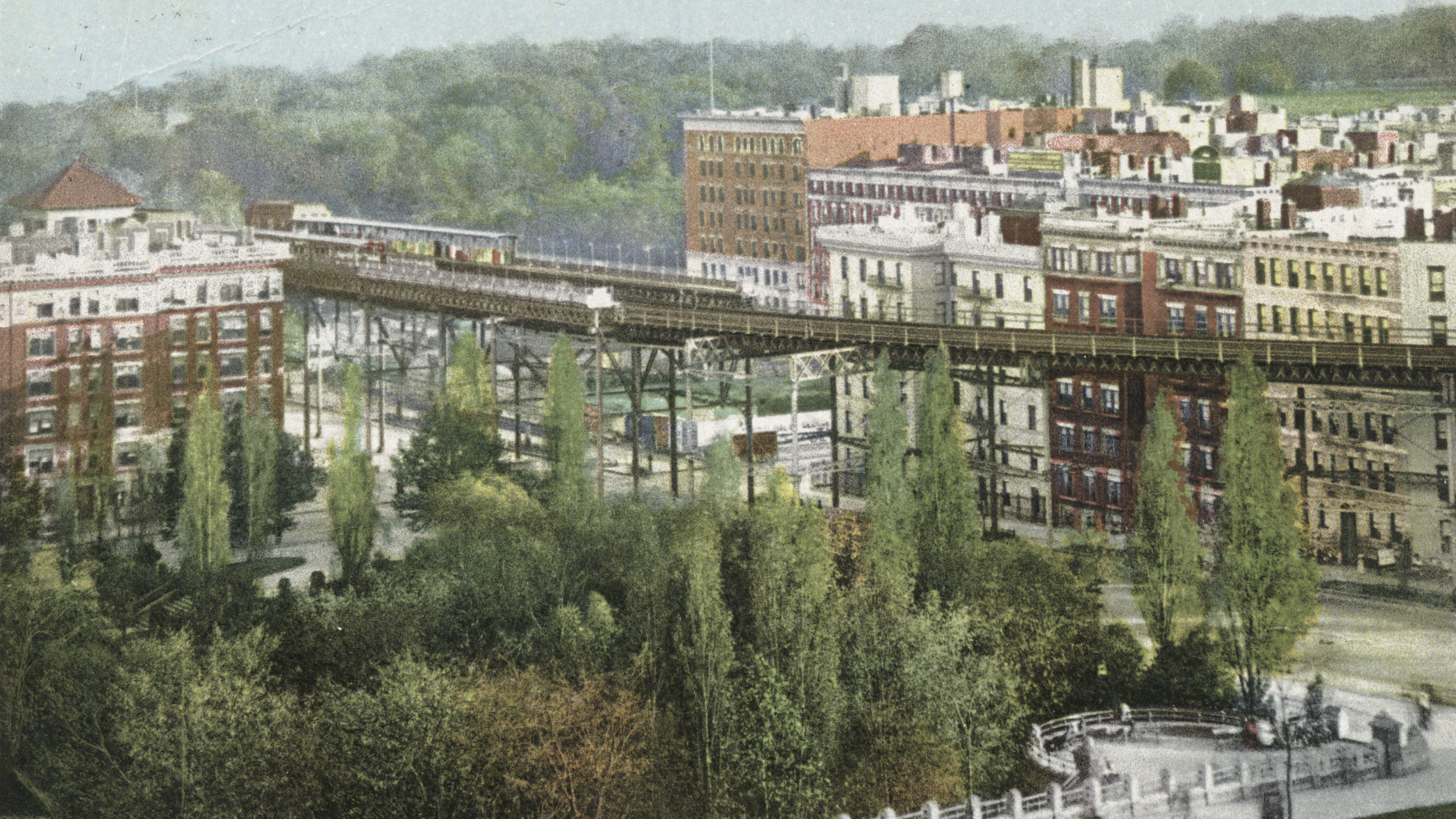
Postcard of Morningside Park in the early 20th century

Several sculptures and structures were installed in Morningside Park after it was completed. In 1900, the statue Lafayette and Washington by Frédéric Auguste Bartholdi was installed at the park's eastern border, within the triangle bounded by Manhattan Avenue, Morningside Avenue and 114th Street. At the time, only one structure had been built in the park, a wooden shanty for tool storage. In 1901, a "women's cottage and refreshment room" was approved along with a $8,250 appropriation for it, and the following year Barney and Chapman proposed an ornate outhouse in the French Gothic style containing a tower with space for tool storage. Ultimately, a simpler one-story restroom structure was erected in 1904, at a site on 114th Street that had been the original location proposed for the "Restawhile". Many residents and neighborhood organizations strongly opposed an oval stadium, proposed between 118th and 120th Streets in 1909, and the idea was eventually scrapped. In 1913, the Carl Schurz Memorial by Karl Bitter and Henry Bacon was placed in the park, followed the next year by Edgar Walter's Seligman (Bear and Faun) Fountain.

Morningside Park quickly began to deteriorate, and complaints of vandalism were recorded as early as 1905. The sidewalks around the park were paved in 1911. When the city proposed to "popularize" Central Park in 1911, local residents complained that Morningside Park had been neglected, was crime-ridden, and had declined because of its use as a playground as opposed to a passive-recreation space. New York City parks commissioner Charles B. Stover stated that the park's issues, which included hillside erosion and lawn damage, were because the southern area had not been outfitted with proper drainage. Further erosion and deterioration was caused by a large Independence Day celebration in 1912, the erosion of the cliff near Blockhouse No. 4 in 1913, and the destruction of part of the overhanging cliff rock in 1915. A request for $94,500 toward Morningside Park's renovation was made in 1914, and by 1916, protests had resulted in the reported completion of the renovation. Also in 1914, a fence was installed around part of the park.

Further controversy developed in the mid-1910s because of the proposed construction of a Catskill Aqueduct pumping station within the park. While a temporary structure had existed in the park since at least the early 1910s, the New York Board of Water Supply began construction of a steel-frame pumping station in January 1916. The plans were not public, and had not been authorized by either the New York City Department of Parks and Recreation (NYC Parks), the New York City Board of Aldermen, or the Municipal Art Commission. Once the public learned of plans for the structure, several civil engineers and associations organized opposition to the project. The sculptor, Gutzon Borglum, filed a lawsuit to stop construction of the pump building that February. Shortly afterward, New York Supreme Court justice Edward R. Finch issued an injunction to stop the project temporarily, citing the project's status as an "illegal encroachment". Ultimately, the Board of Water Supply applied for a permanent pumping station, though in July 1916 the Board of Aldermen voted instead to build an underground pump structure.

Improvements to Morningside Park were also conducted from the 1920s through the 1960s. In its annual report of 1929, NYC Parks reported that much of the vegetation had to be replanted because of neglect or vandalism. By the mid-20th century, Morningside Park was perceived as dangerous. Because of its proximity to Harlem, a largely Black neighborhood, crime in the park was perceived as signs of a racial conflict. In 1935 The New York Times reported that the Teachers College of Columbia University had posted a sign in a dormitory informing students "it is not safe to enter Morningside Park at any time of the day or night." The Times also reported residents were concerned that "unemployed destitute" individuals posed a danger to the park's safety.

A playground and comfort station was added between 113th and 114th Streets on the east side of Morningside Park in November 1935; the 113th–114th Streets comfort station was replaced by 1945. A polygonal comfort station was proposed for the southeastern corner of the park in 1936 but was not built. A playground at the northeastern corner of Morningside Park was also constructed in 1935; it was expanded with extra equipment in 1941, including athletic courts, a wading pool, exercise structure, swings, slides, and a children's play area. Also, by 1941, rock outcroppings on the south lawn were removed to make way for softball fields. During this era, a proposal to rename Morningside Park to "Franz Boas Park" was rejected by parks commissioner Robert Moses. The 1904 restroom structure was demolished in 1952, except for its western wall, at which point jagged-topped stone barriers were erected next to paths in the park. Two years later, the bronze railings on the western and southern borders were replaced with iron picket fences. A playground on Morningside Avenue between 116th and 119th Streets was finished in 1956, while sandboxes were installed on the Morningside Drive overlook balconies the next year. The wrought-iron fence on the eastern border was replaced, and the park's hillside restored, in 1962.

=== 1950s and 1960s controversies ===
==== Columbia athletic complex ====
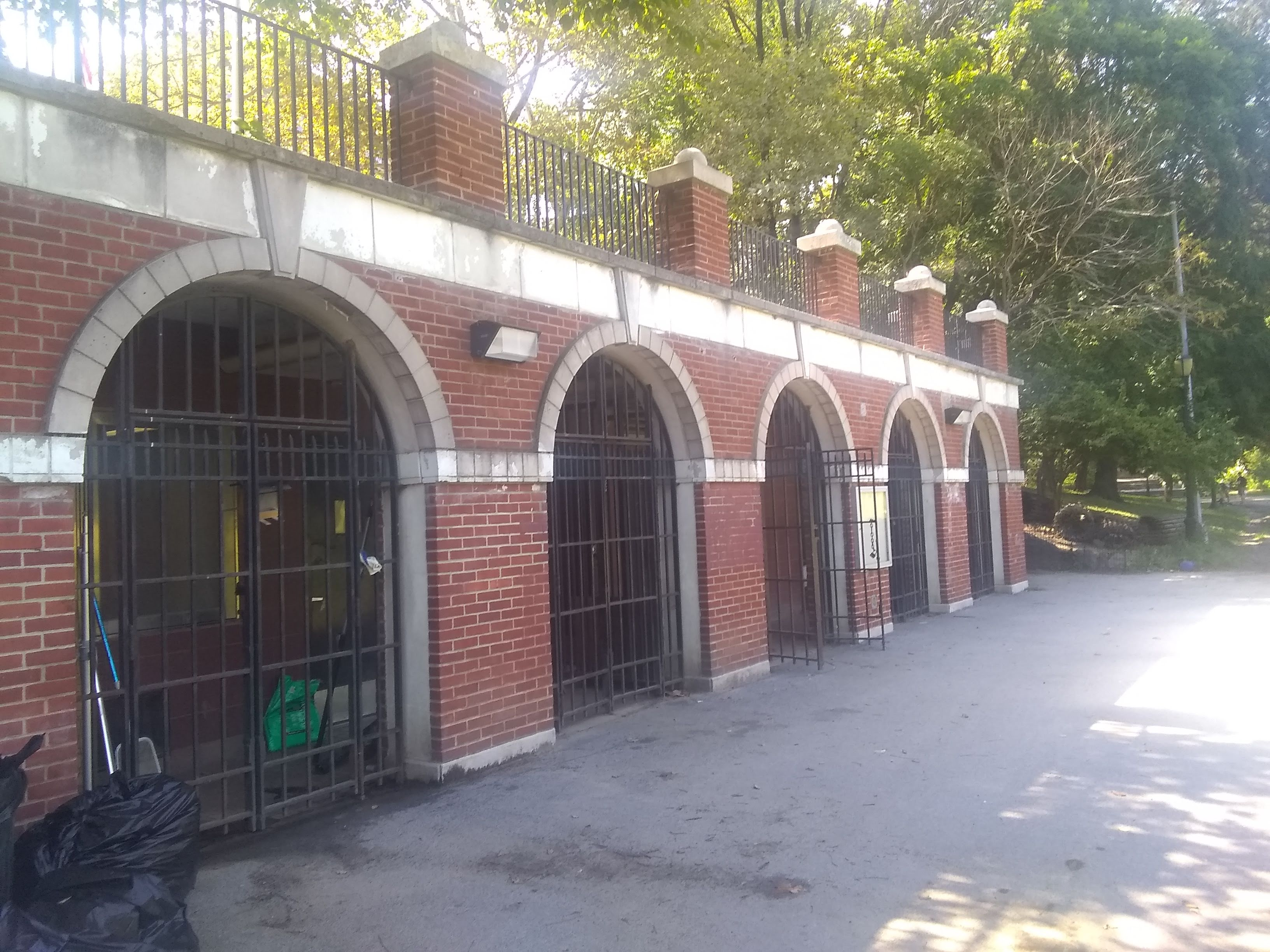
A brick arcade in the southern section of Morningside Park

In a 1955 piece in the Times, one observer noted, "the park was virtually off-bounds to [Columbia University] students and faculty as "too dangerous". At the time, parks commissioner Moses and Columbia president Grayson L. Kirk were discussing allowing Columbia to use part of Morningside Park. The plan was approved by the New York City Board of Estimate in December 1955, and soon after, Moses and Manhattan borough president Hulan Jack announced that Columbia would build a comfort station/field house, storage building, and athletic complex on a 3.5-acre (1.4 ha) section of the park. The athletic complex contained two fields for softball, three for football, and one for soccer and was opened in May 1957. The arrangement between Columbia and the city stipulated that the university would be the sole user of the complex during weekdays between June and October, while it would be open to the public at other times. The fields soon became popular with neighborhood residents. In 1961, new lighting was installed in the southern section of Morningside Park to deter crime.

More controversial was Columbia's proposal in January 1960 to erect a building to the north of the athletic fields. The structure, on a 2-acre (0.81 ha) plot, would have an upper level to be used as a Columbia gym and a lower level community center. The complex was supported by Moses, Mayor Robert F. Wagner Jr., and the New York City Council. A 50-year lease was approved in March 1960, signed in August, and accepted by the Board of Estimate. The structure was to cost $9 million, of which $1 million was donated in May 1962 by alumnus Francis S. Levien. The project faced some opposition by 1964 because of Columbia's rapid expansion. Some residents denounced the proposed Morningside Park construction as a "land grab", while others protested the proposed gentrification that would accompany such expansion. Subsequently, in March 1964, neighborhood associations and officials toured the park to demonstrate its deteriorated conditions and need for funding, and to show that it was safe.

Thomas Hoving, one of the parks commissioners who succeeded Moses, said in January 1966 that he was "pretty damned upset" about the deal because it would perpetuate segregation. The planned separate east and west entrances were seen as an attempt to circumvent the Civil Rights Act of 1964, which banned racially segregated facilities, as Morningside Heights' population was largely white while Harlem's was largely Black. The University's administration under Grayson Kirk denied that this reflected racial bias and stressed that greater park services would benefit the Harlem community. In March 1966, the University's student council passed a resolution asking the University to reconsider the gym plans, and two months later, bills to ban its construction were introduced in the State Senate and Assembly. That October, Columbia announced it would suspend groundbreaking for the gym until the following year, and by May 1967, university officials were considering changing the plans. Unsatisfied, protesters picketed outside Kirk's home that July, while Harlem officials decried a proposed compromise to build a community swimming pool instead. Undeterred, the Board of Estimate voted to approve the plans in October 1967, and despite further protests that November, construction began in February 1968. At the time, The New York Times architecture writer Ada Louise Huxtable said, "the real tragedy of the whole Columbia gym affair is that this dubious and even harmful project has been carried out in good faith."

Columbia students and faculty amplified their opposition to the gym project in mid-1968, resulting in major student protests. That April, the faculty of the Columbia Graduate School of Architecture, Planning and Preservation called on Kirk and the trustees to reconsider the gym. Student organizations such as Students for a Democratic Society and the Student Afro-American Society held "sit-ins", and Mayor John Lindsay requested that work be suspended while the protests were ongoing. Students occupied administration and classroom buildings and shut down the university for several weeks. The Columbia faculty formed a committee to intervene after a large 2,500-person protest on April 30, which involved a New York City Police Department raid at several buildings. Meanwhile, parks commissioner August Heckscher II said that if Columbia was to drop its plans, he would have a community recreation center built at the site. The same month, $500,000 was allocated for restorations to the park, and the new Morningside Park Preservation Committee filed a lawsuit alleging the misuse of parkland. Kirk resigned in August 1968 because of the protests and was replaced as Columbia president by Andrew W. Cordier. Under his leadership, Columbia's trustees studied possible new sites for the gym before voting in March 1969 to cancel the project altogether.

==== Elementary school ====
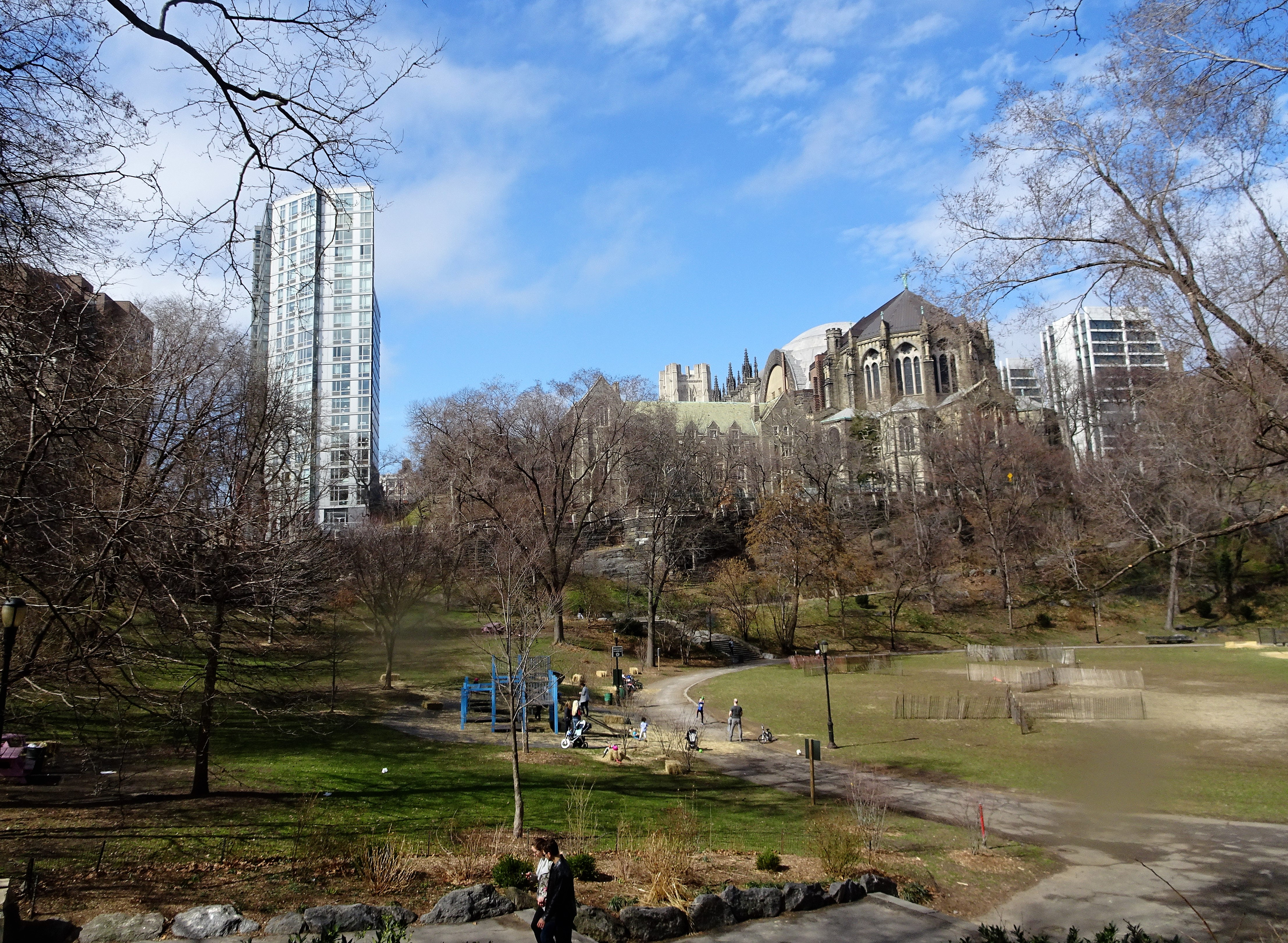
A playground and paths at the south end of the park, looking west toward the Cathedral of St. John the Divine

At the same time as the Columbia controversy, another dispute arose after the New York State Legislature designated the northwestern corner of Morningside Park as the site of a public elementary school in 1963. Both Mayor Wagner and borough president Edward R. Dudley supported this initiative; Dudley said the site was "rubbish-strewn and a danger spot for children", even though the Municipal Art Commission argued it was atop the ruins of Blockhouse No. 4.

After the City Planning Commission proposed another site several blocks to the east, neighborhood groups alleged the plan would further segregation since the mostly minority population of Harlem would be unable to reach the school. Other neighborhood groups opposed the use of Morningside Park for anything other than recreational use. The City Planning Commission's chairman recommended that the proposed school site at Morningside Park be disapproved, but in February 1964, the Board of Estimate approved the plan anyway and rezoned 1.35 acres (0.55 ha) from parkland to educational use. Frederick G. Frost, Jr. & Associates designed the structure, known as PS 36 Margaret Douglas Elementary School, as a concrete-and-brick educational complex atop a stone base and rock outcroppings. The school was built between 1965 and 1966 and was the first in the city designed solely for early elementary grades, serving kindergarten through second grade.

=== Cleanup and renovations ===
==== Late 20th century ====
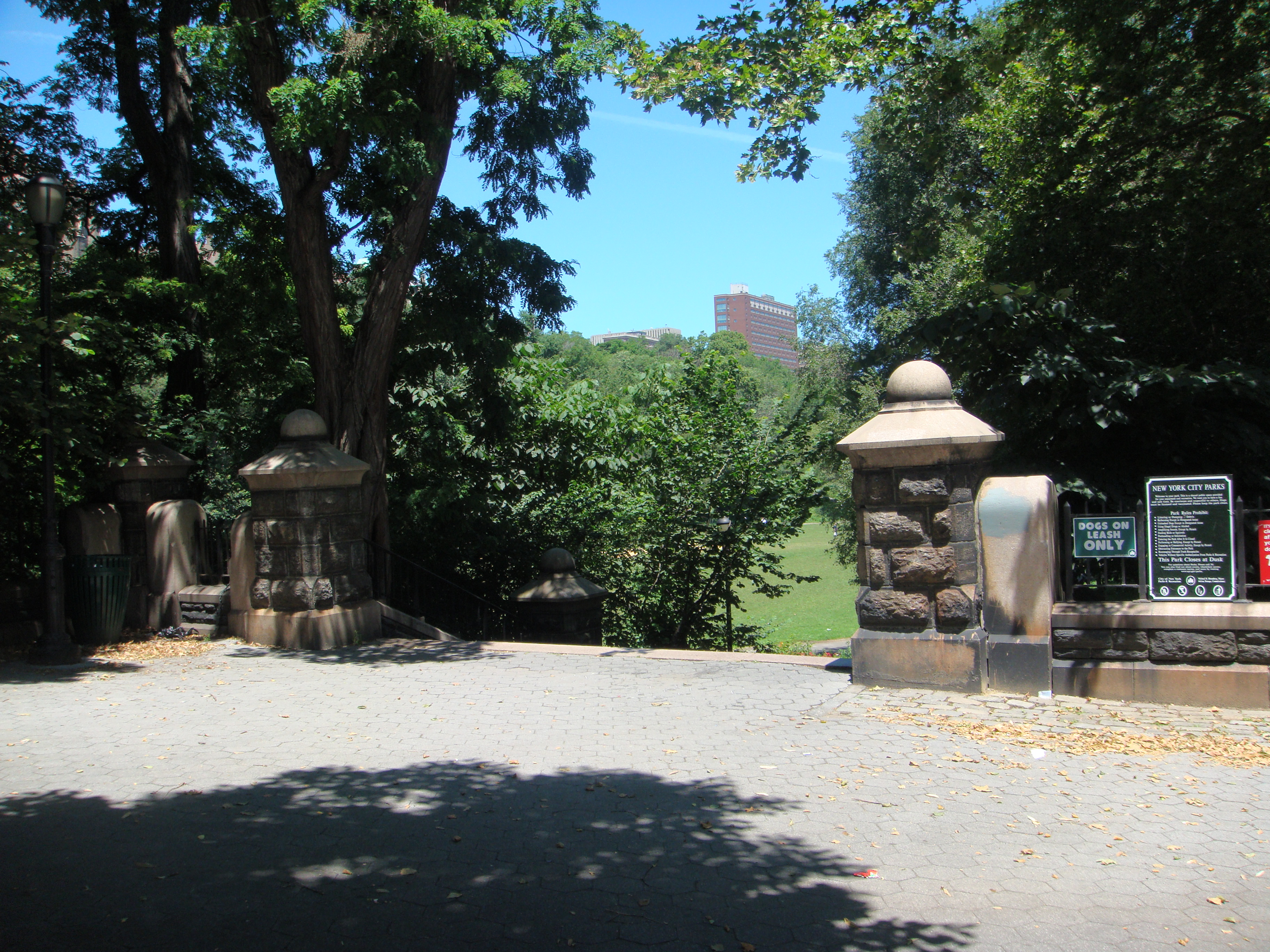
One of the park entrances, which is flanked by stone posts

Even by the 1960s, Morningside Park had a reputation for being unsafe and unsanitary. After the Columbia protests ended, Morningside Park was the site of several murders, muggings, and other crimes, furthering its notoriety. Litter lined the park, and it became a frequent homeless hangout. So common were crimes there that Morningside Heights residents nicknamed it "Muggingside Park". In 1971, after the controversy over the now-canceled Columbia site had subsided, NYC Parks published its "Proposed Rehabilitation of Columbia Gym Site", which called for a playground on the site's eastern edge and new paths on the western side. It was reported that Columbia had agreed to pay compensation for the demolition that had occurred in the park. This resulted in the formation of the West Harlem Coalition for Morningside Park. Advocates started focusing on Morningside Park and Olmsted's other parks in 1972, the 150th anniversary of his birth. The West Harlem Coalition hired Lawrence Halprin Associates in 1973, but plans for renovating Morningside Park were postponed after the 1975 New York City fiscal crisis. Huxtable wrote in the Times, "Morningside Park may now be the city's most crime-ridden, underutilized and dangerous spot." More than a decade after the Columbia gym plan was canceled, the construction fencing remained on the site.

The state's department of parks was in talks with Bond, Ryder and Associates for a "redevelopment design" of Morningside Park by 1978 with the West Harlem Community Organization and Morningside Park Coalition participating in the redesign process. In 1981, as part of the "Olmsted Project", the New York City Landmarks Preservation Commission (LPC) held two shows that depicted Morningside Park, including a Metropolitan Museum of Art exhibit. At that time, Morningside Park was being considered by the LPC for scenic landmark status, but this was opposed by residents and activists wanted to redesign the park. The same year, Thomas Kiel and other Columbia undergraduates founded the Friends of Morningside Park, which supported returning the park to its original design.

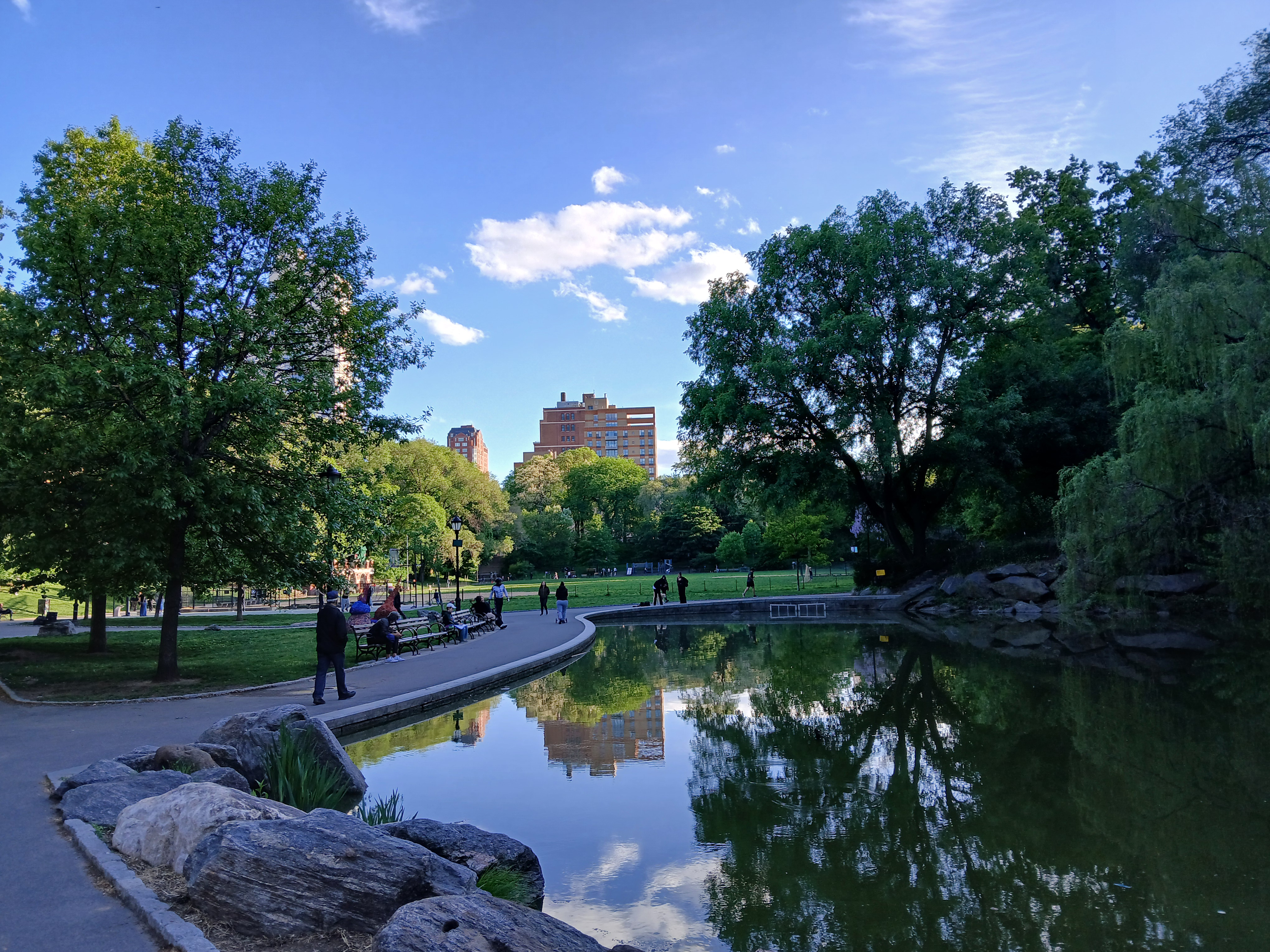
Pond at the site of the unbuilt Columbia recreation facility

NYC Parks drew up plans for a $12 million restoration of the park between 1987 and 1989. At that point, Columbia had given $250,000 toward the renovation, half of what it had pledged toward the restoration of the site. A $5 million first phase began in early 1989 and was conducted by a partnership of Quennell Rothschild Associates and Bond Ryder James. It entailed converting the excavated crater left by the abandoned gymnasium project into a waterfall and ornamental pond, which was the first part of the renovation to be completed in 1989. The pond, part of Olmsted and Vaux's original plan, cost $950,000, about three times as much as "standard landscaping". Contractors installed wells to feed the waterfall and the pond. The reconstruction, which focused on the park between 110th and 114th Streets, also included installing new playground equipment, planting trees, creating a picnic area and renovating the sports fields. The 1957 fieldhouse was also redesigned, and a new entrance was installed at 113th Street and Morningside Drive. This renovation was completed in 1993. There was little funding to perform further renovations at the northern part of Morningside Park then, and there was just one maintenance worker for the entire park. As a result, the northern part of the park was still overgrown with weeds and frequented by drug addicts.

NYC Parks began a renovation of the 116th Street stairs in July 1996 and completed it two years later at a cost of $650,000. After the statues were refurbished, the bluestone steps at 116th Street were renovated in 1998. The same year, construction began on the Dr. Thomas Kiel Arboretum in the northern part of the park, named after a founder and former chairman of the Friends of Morningside Park who had died in 1996. In 1998 and 1999, the Morningside Area Alliance (MAA), a neighborhood community group, received $35,000 in grant funding from the Kaplan Foundation to work on the park. A portion was used to assess what the park needed done most urgently, while a second portion went to restructure the largely disorganized Friends volunteer group. The resulting "revitalization plan" suggested further maintenance and capital improvements and enhancements to its character and appearance. The study also found there was still a widespread perception of danger, and that the park needed additional security measures and better management.

==== 21st century ====
By 2001, Morningside Park's condition had improved because of ongoing reconstruction projects, and it was no longer considered as dangerous an area as it had been in the 1970s. That year, a master plan for the park was approved. Several stairs and entrances were rebuilt, including at or near 114th, 116th, 120th, and 122nd Streets, and playgrounds to the south of the ball fields and at the park's northeast corner were renovated. The ball fields and northern section's scenery were restored in 2006, and construction began on a playground north of 116th Street in 2007. This playground was completed in late 2008. Morningside Park was designated a New York City landmark in 2008, decades after similar statuses had been conferred upon Central and Riverside Parks. The next year, more trees were planted within the park, including a sequoia tree.

NYC Parks presented a plan to restore the northern section, including the 123rd Street Playground there, in 2011. The playground was renovated in two phases: in 2013 and in 2019. The 118th Street Playground was rebuilt between December 2019 and March 2021 for $3.3 million. The waterfall was fixed in 2018, then stopped working shortly afterward. The area around Morningside Park, once a desolate area with a reputation for being crime-ridden, had become gentrified by the 2010s. Fears of crime remained, especially after 18-year-old Barnard College student Tessa Majors was fatally stabbed in a late-2019 mugging within the park. Columbia University student Davide Giri was fatally stabbed nearby in 2021 in what The New York Times called "an eerie reprise" of Majors's death.

Local street food vendor Crab Man Mike received a permit to build a cafe in the park in 2021, and the LPC approved plans for the construction of the cafe two years later. Also in 2023, neighborhood residents also began advocating for the waterfall to be repaired; at the time, the waterfall had not flowed for four years. Following these requests, Columbia's Fu Foundation School of Engineering and Applied Science indicated that it would fix the waterfall. Columbia and NYC Parks also began researching the algae in the park's pond in mid-2023, and the waterfall began flowing again in late 2024. The park's cafe, originally scheduled to open in mid-2024, ultimately opened in May 2025.

== Geography and design ==
Morningside Park covers approximately 30 acres (12 ha) in Upper Manhattan, New York City. (Note: NYC Parks gives the exact area as 29.89 acres (12.10 ha).) The park is irregularly shaped and follows a largely north–south alignment, though the northern portion of the park curves westward. All of the sidewalks were asphalt until 1911; as of 2008, they consist of Belgian blocks and concrete and contain trees. There are at least seventeen entrances to the park. The closest New York City Subway stations to the park are Cathedral Parkway–110th Street and 116th Street, both served by the B and C trains; the park is also served by MTA Regional Bus Operations' M3, M4, M7, M10, M11, and M116 routes.

=== Bordering streets ===
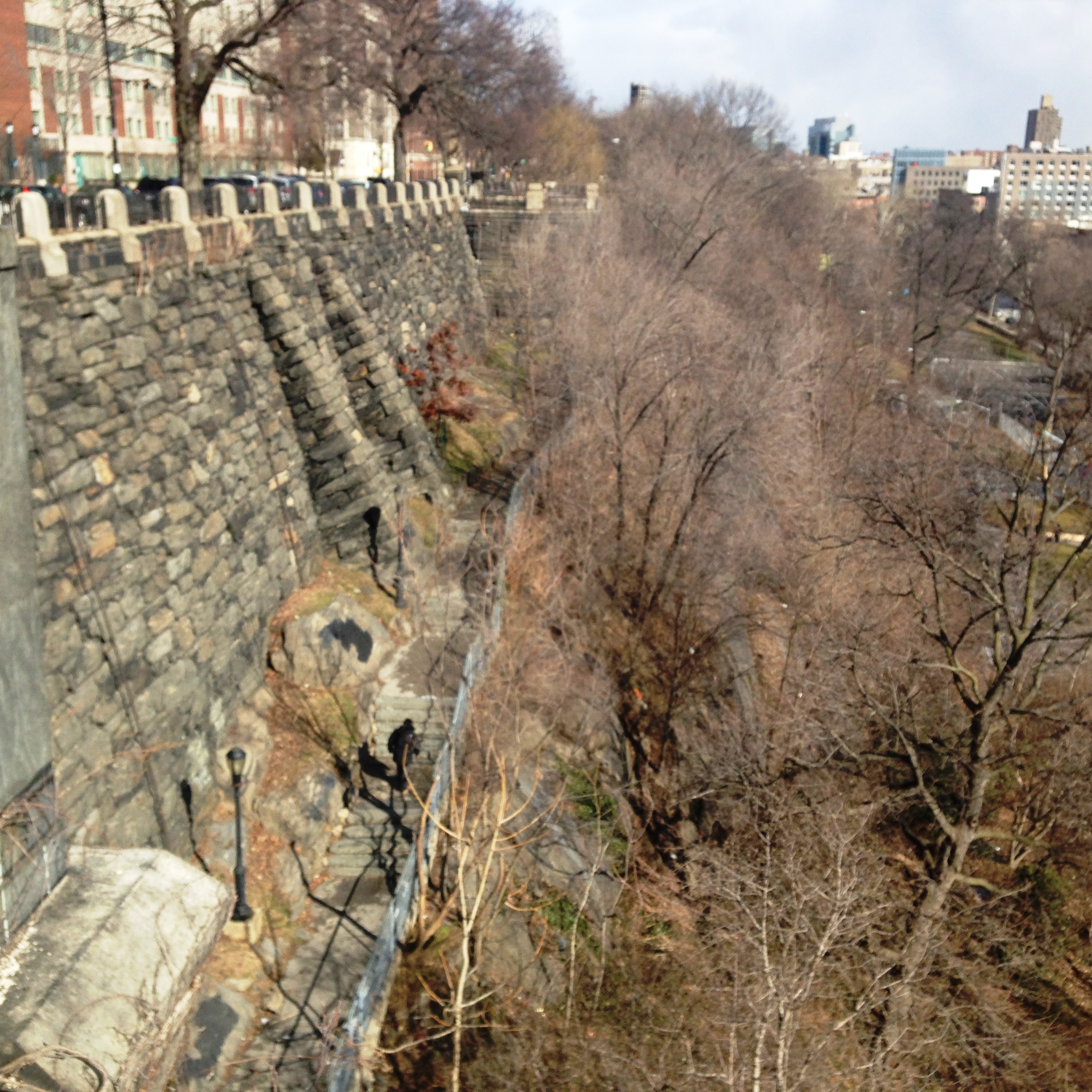
View of the retaining wall

The park's western border is formed by Morningside Drive, which is on top of a large retaining wall that drops sharply to the east. The retaining wall contains gneiss piers topped with granite, and as a parapet fence consisting of granite posts and an iron picket fence. Originally, this section also contained bronze railings, though these were replaced in 1954. At each of the intersections with Morningside Drive, except for those at 113th and 114th Streets, there are "overlook bays" – balconies that slightly overhang the park below. The bays at 111th and 119th Street contain openings, originally used as rain shelters. All the bays are polygonal shaped, except for the one at 116th Street, which is round and contains the Carl Schurz Monument. From this side, there are entrances at 112th, 113th, 114th, 116th, 118th, 120th, and 122nd Streets, with granite and gneiss stairways leading from the bays at the 116th through 120th Street entrances. A security booth at the 116th Street entrance was installed in 2006.

The southern border of the park is formed by West 110th Street, also known as Cathedral Parkway. There is an entrance to the park from the intersection of 110th Street and Morningside Drive, within an overlook bay that contains asphalt paving; this leads to a stone stairway. Another entrance exists at the intersection with Manhattan Avenue, on the east made of Belgian blocks and hexagonal asphalt tiles.

The eastern border of the park is formed by Manhattan Avenue, between 110th and 113th Streets, and by Morningside Avenue, between 113th and 123rd Streets. It contains entrances at 112th, 113th, 114th, 116th, 120th, and 123rd Streets, as well as between 117th and 118th Streets. Along the sidewalk is a wrought-iron picket fence with stone piers, which was originally installed in 1915 and replaced in 1962. A group of seventeen London plane trees are next to the Lafayette and Washington statue.

The northern border of the park is formed by West 123rd Street. There is an entrance plaza from the northwestern corner of the park, which is paved with concrete and flanked with stone posts. Along the sidewalk is a wrought-iron picket fence with stone piers, which was originally installed in 1915 and replaced in 1962.

=== Geology and topography ===
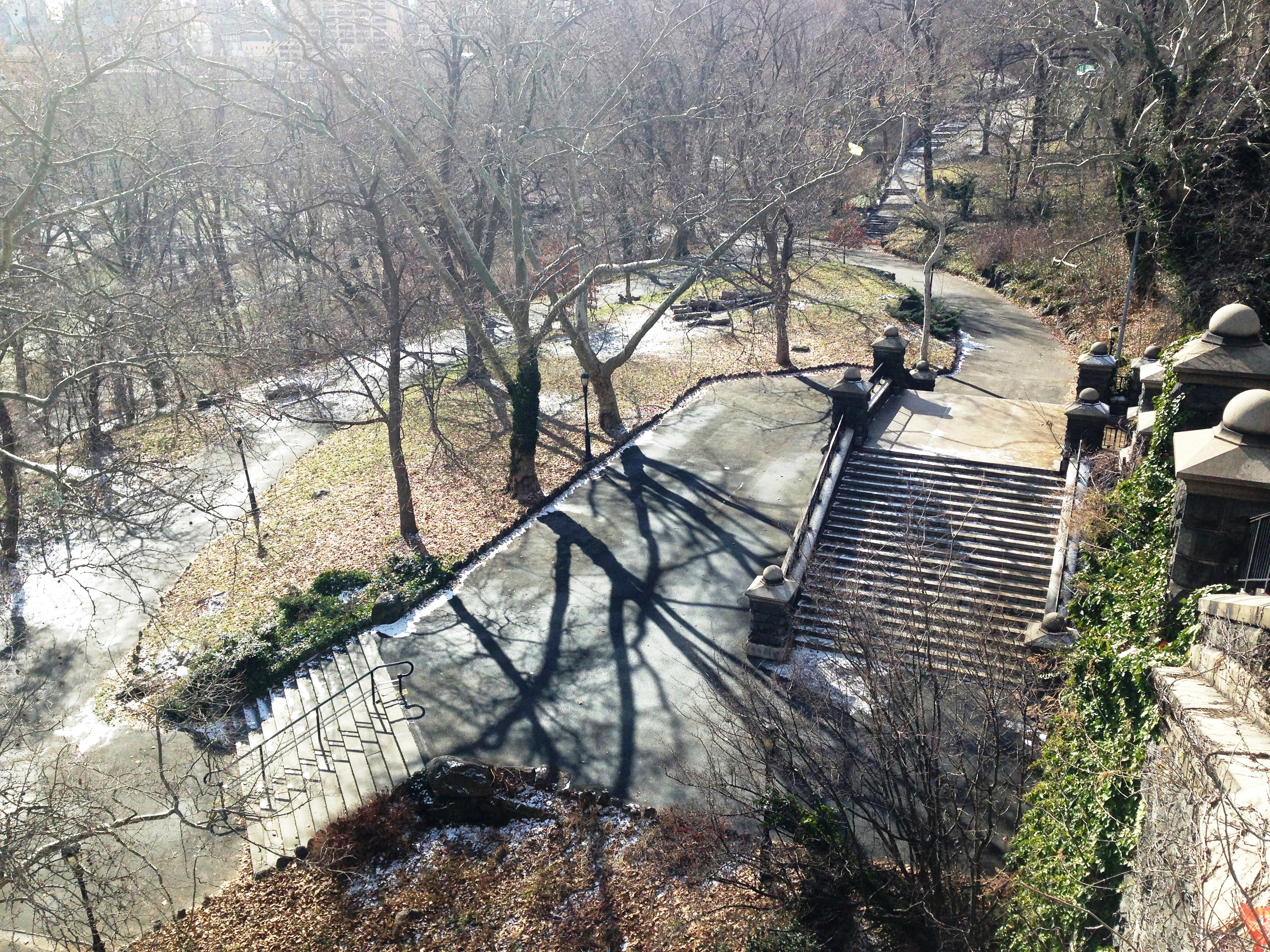
View of Morningside Park's central section from atop the cliff

Morningside Park's distinctive natural geography is a rugged cliff of Manhattan schist rock. The geology is similar to that of Central Park and contains, from top to bottom: Manhattan schist, a metamorphosed sedimentary rock; Lowerre quartzite, a metamorphosed rock; Inwood marble, a metamorphosed limestone that overlays the gneiss; and Fordham gneiss, an older deeper layer. A large rock formation of Manhattan schist in the park is a visible sign of the bedrock below much of lower and northern Manhattan. Rock outcroppings are prevalent in Morningside Park and nearby Central Park, Marcus Garvey Park, and Riverside Park. Besides the cliff, one large geological feature that remains is a glacial groove at 121st Street, which had been noted as early as 1916. The western border of the park between 122nd and 123rd Streets is taken up by PS 36, on a rock drop off; this occupies the former site of the ruins of Blockhouse No. 4, which was used as a source of stone until the park's creation. A tablet was placed on the site by the Women's Auxiliary of the American Scenic and Historic Preservation Society in 1904. Furthermore, part of the cliff was destroyed in 1915.

A plateau, on the eastern side of the park, was mostly demolished during the failed Columbia University gym construction project. Today, the site includes a waterfall and a pond, built between 1989 and 1993. The waterfall is artificial and uses water pumped using motors from the city's water system. The pond has been frequented by several species of birds, including great blue herons, night herons, red-winged blackbirds, painted turtles, and mallard ducks.

The park also contained meadows when it was constructed. These were at the south end from 110th to 114th Streets; in the central section from 116th to 120th Streets; and at the northeast corner. They were developed as playgrounds and playing fields in the mid-20th century and the rock outcroppings were destroyed. The central and northern meadows were redeveloped as playgrounds while the southern meadow was converted to sports fields.

=== Paths and plantings ===
Morningside Park was designed with many paths and plantings. The paths usually followed the topography, though there are several locations where stone steps connect paths at different locations. There are stone stairs connecting the two portions of 120th Street, and between 116th Street on the west side of the park and 114th Street on the east side. The paths were made originally of gravel, concrete, and asphalt, while the stairs were made of bluestone with rockwork edging on the outer portions. Benches, lights, railings, fences, and stone walls were added over the years; the rockwork edging was replaced. The northern meadow's paths were rebuilt in 1940–1941, while the paths around PS 36 and the unbuilt Columbia gym were reconfigured or removed in the late 1960s. With the waterfall's construction, the paths at the unbuilt gym site were rebuilt from 1989 to 1993; some of the stairs have also been renovated over the years. New York Road Runners hosts a weekly 3-mile (4.8 km) Open Run along the paths.

The plantings in Morningside Park were designed at several stages of the park's development. Accounts vary on whether plantings were present before the park was built; in 1871, park engineer Montgomery A. Kellogg called the area a "barren piece of ground", Samuel Parsons described the site as having "a considerable amount of native growth", albeit limited mainly to vines, herbs, and shrubs. Parsons also stated that because of the poor soil in the original plan of the park, "fine trees" could not grow there. By the 1910s, vandalism, erosion, and crowds had caused damage to many of the plantings. Major landscaping projects took place in 1929, 1941, 1962, and 2006.

== Features ==
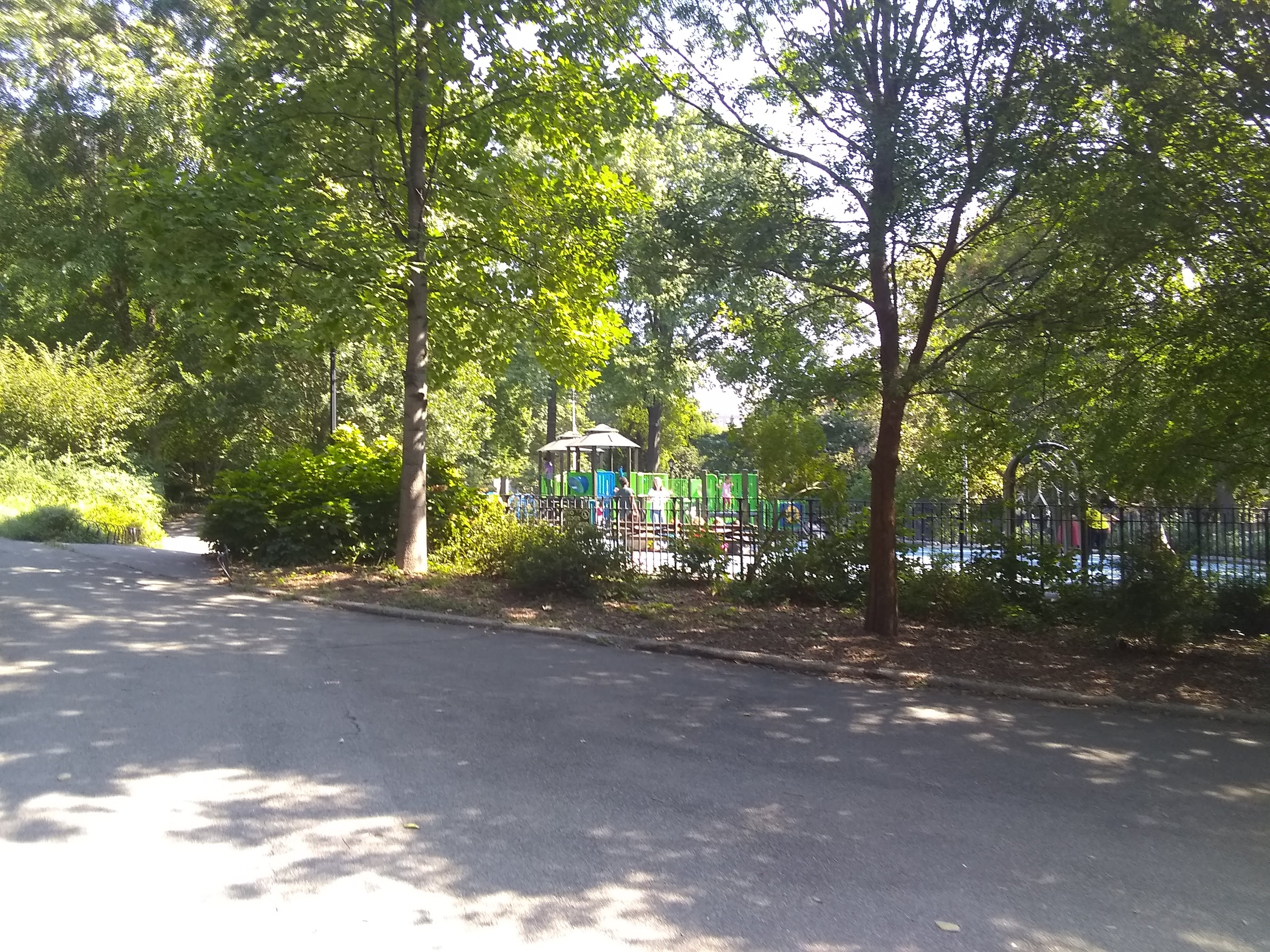
The playground at 116th Street, seen from a nearby path

Morningside Park contains several sporting fields, which were mostly built starting in the 1930s. Two baseball fields and a basketball court are at the southern end of the park. Three other basketball courts are near the central portion of Morningside Park. To the north are two basketball courts and four handball courts. There are also children's play structures at 110th, 113th, 116th, 118th, and 123rd Streets at the bottom of the cliff, and a restroom at 123rd Street. At the intersection of Manhattan Avenue and 112th Street is the Morningside Park Cafe, which was designed by George Ranalli Architect and includes a kiosk with a kitchen.

Morningside Dog Run is an enclosed space for dog owners to bring their dogs to play. Consisting primarily of wood chips over dirt, there are two fenced-in areas. The larger section has multiple levels, separated by a step. The dog run is most easily accessible from the east at 114th Street and from the west at either 114th or 116th Streets. There is also a barbecue area at 121st Street.

The Kiel Arboretum is in the northern section of the park from 116th to 121st Streets. The design of the arboretum was based on original plans for Central Park sketched by Olmsted and Vaux in 1858. While later abandoned, these arboretum plans involved paths leading through several hundred species of trees and shrubs. The plans re-emerged when the Kiel Arboretum was built in 1998. Plantings of trees from the Magnoliaceae (magnolia) family and shrubs from the Ranunculaceae (buttercup) and Berberidaceae (barberry) families were used to start the tree collection.

Over the years, several playgrounds have been constructed at Morningside Park; as of 2019 there are four playgrounds within the park. The first one, at the bottom of the stairs at 114th Street, was built in 1903–1904 and demolished in 1952. A playground in the northeast corner was constructed in 1935 and renovated in 1941; it was restored several more times, including in 1992 and 2000. Another playground, built in 1955–1956 at Morningside Avenue between 116th and 119th Streets, contains facilities such as shuffleboard and basketball courts, and a playground with a wading pool, swings, slides, and a sandbox. A third play area at 113th Street contains play equipment, while a fourth facility is at 110th Street. In 2008, a new playground opened within the park at 116th Street, replacing part of the playground between 116th and 119th Streets.

== Art ==
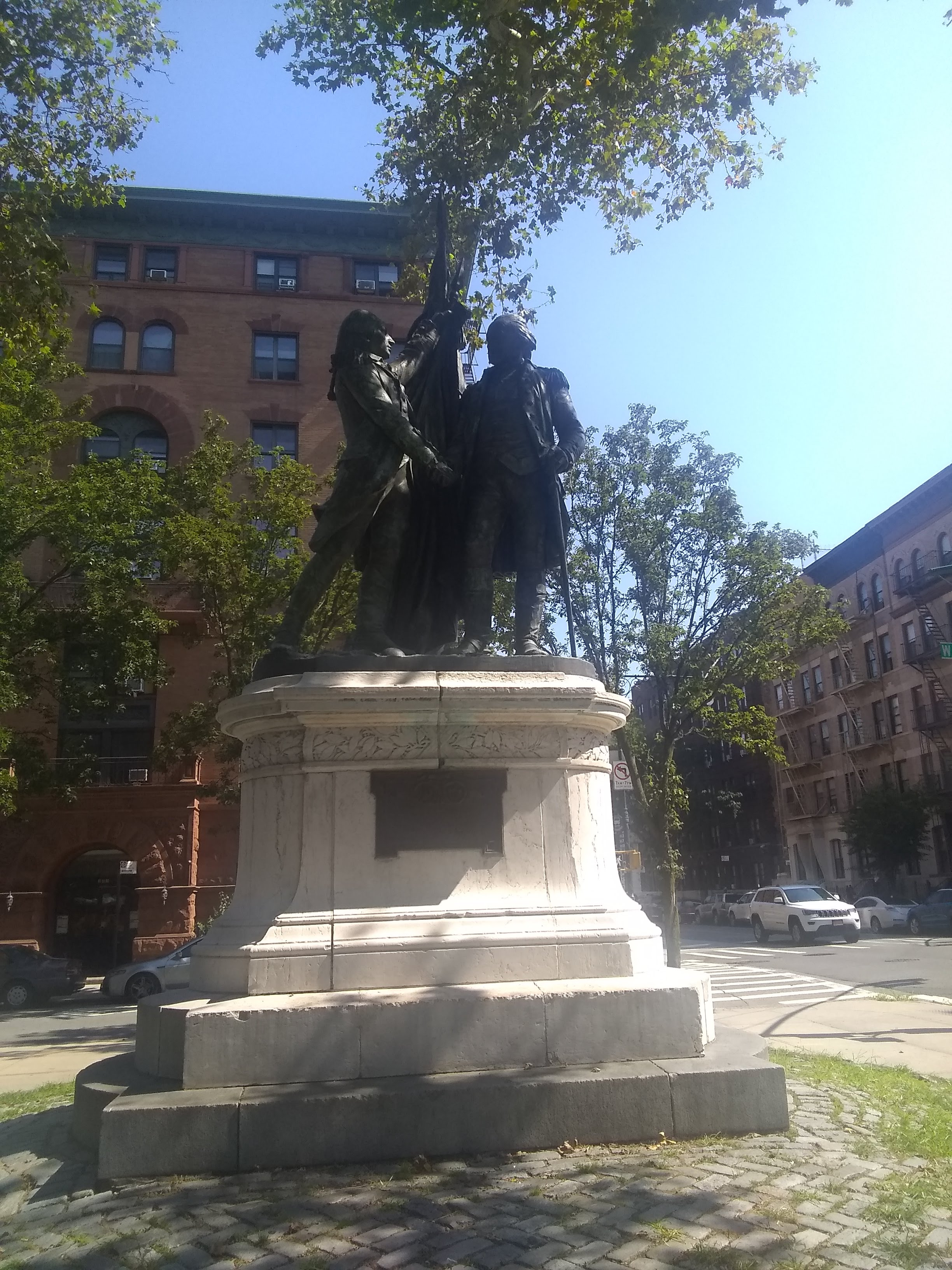
The Lafayette and Washington statue

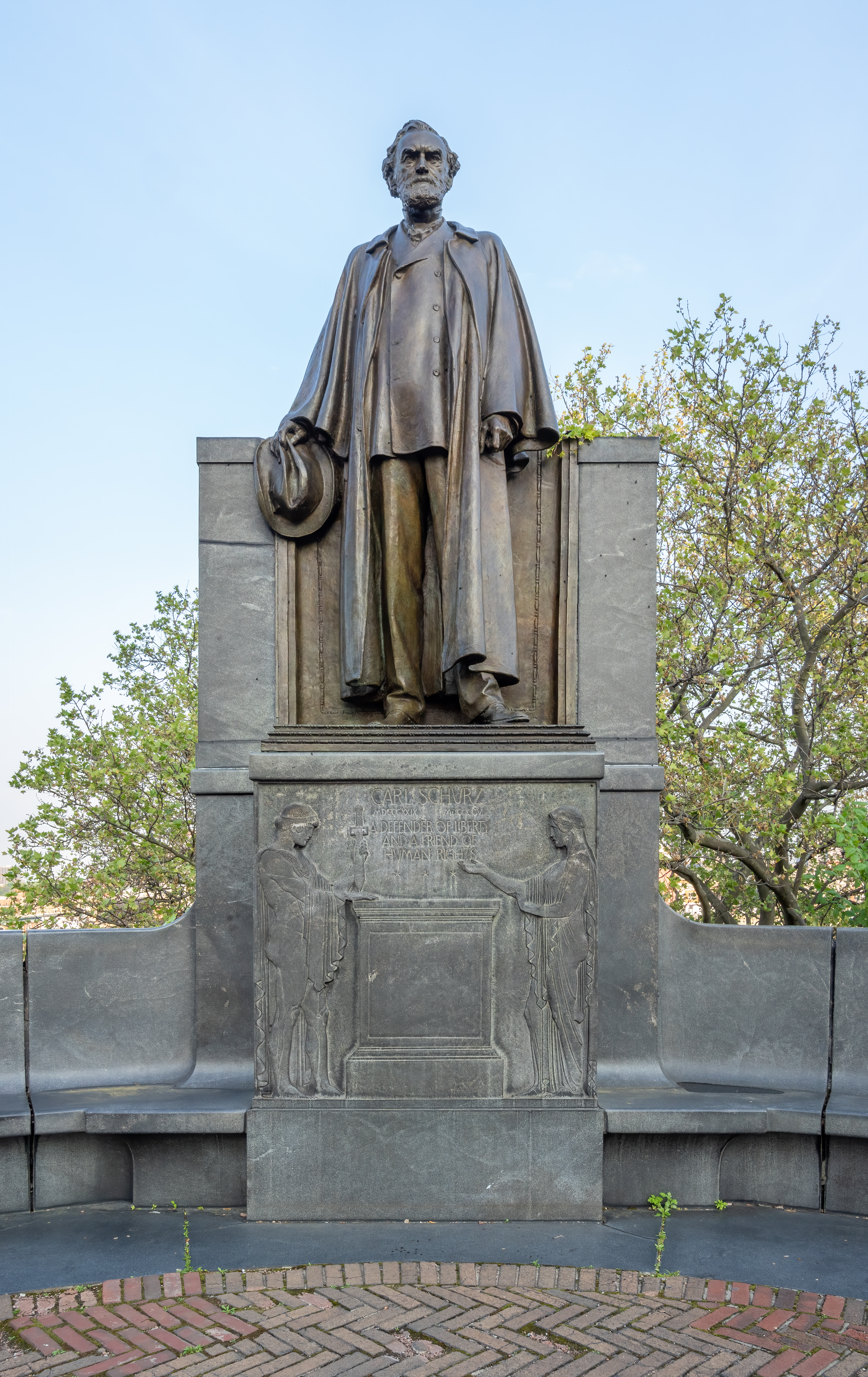
The Carl Schurz Monument

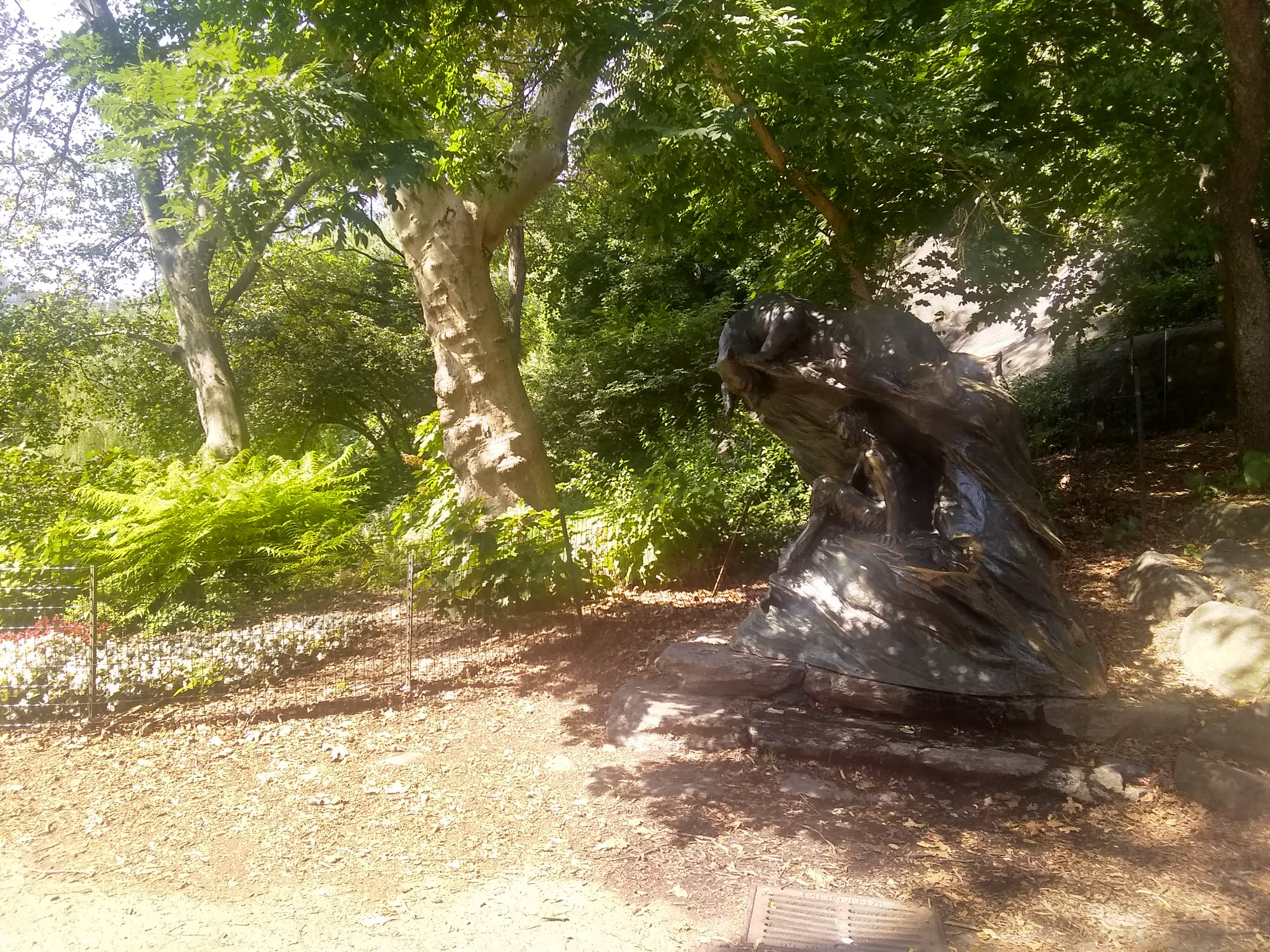
The Seligman Fountain

There are three sculptures in Morningside Park, all of which date from the beginning of the 20th century. The first is the Lafayette and Washington statue (1900) by Frédéric Auguste Bartholdi, at the triangle between Manhattan Avenue, Morningside Avenue and 114th Street. Though dedicated in 1890, it was not brought to the triangle until 1900. The statue commemorates the alliance between the U.S. and France during the American Revolutionary War and consists of a bronze sculptural group depicting General George Washington and the Marquis de Lafayette, both in uniform and shaking hands. The pair is atop a white marble pedestal and contains an associated bronze plaque on a gray granite base. It is an exact replica of a statue in the Place des États-Unis, Paris.

The second is the Carl Schurz Monument (1913), with a statue by Karl Bitter and setting by architect Henry Bacon. It stands on a brick plaza at Morningside Drive and West 116th Street, overlooking the park from the west, though it is officially part of the park. The statue consists of a bronze depiction of politician Carl Schurz, standing in the middle of an exedra (or semicircular recess) made of granite. The "arms" of the exedra contain reliefs depicting Schurz's stature as a person who fought against slavery and for better treatment of Native Americans. Beneath the figure are carved stone reliefs flanked by bronze luminaires. The monument's side and central relief carvings, made in stone, may have been created by Bitter's associates and assistants, while the low granite relief carvings may have been made by the Piccirilli Brothers. The sculpture combines elements of the Archaic Greek and Austrian/Viennese Secessionist styles. The monument was unveiled to the city in 1913 and restored in the 1930s.

The third is the Seligman (Bear and Faun) fountain (1914) by Edgar Walter. It was dedicated in memory of Alfred L. Seligman, the National Highways Protective Association's vice president. Plans for the fountain's dedication in Morningside Park were revealed in 1911, predating Seligman's death in a traffic accident in 1912. The 7-foot-tall (2.1 m) fountain contains a depiction of a grotto, above which a bear hangs. Below the grotto, a faun is depicted playing the pipes. The fountain includes a drinking fountain and a dogs' drinking basin. It was restored in 1997.

== Management ==
Morningside Park is owned, operated, and managed by NYC Parks. Friends of Morningside Park, a nonprofit organization founded in 1981 to support returning the park to its original design, is the park's primary advocacy and community stewardship organization. Since its founding, the group has rehabilitated the park through volunteer work, as well as donations for staffing and equipment. The organization fell apart between 1996 and 1998 following the death of founder Thomas Kiel. In 2001, around fourteen major public events were organized by volunteers in the park, including festivals, concerts, and holiday celebrations. By 2005, Friends of Morningside Park had approximately 1,000 volunteers. The organization receives a moderate amount of money compared to similar nonprofits that maintain New York City public parks. As of 2013, it received about $50,000 a year in private donations, and the largest-ever single donation was $10,000.

The Central Park Conservancy, which maintains nearby Central Park, also provides maintenance support and staff training programs for other public parks in New York City, including Morningside Park. In 2005, the Conservancy created the Historic Harlem Parks initiative, providing horticultural and maintenance support and mentoring in Morningside Park, St. Nicholas Park, Jackie Robinson Park, and Marcus Garvey Park.

== See also ==
- List of New York City Designated Landmarks in Manhattan above 110th Street
- List of New York City scenic landmarks
- List of parks in New York City
