= Morningside Drive (Manhattan) =

Street in Manhattan, New York

Coordinates: 40°48′10″N 73°57′33″W

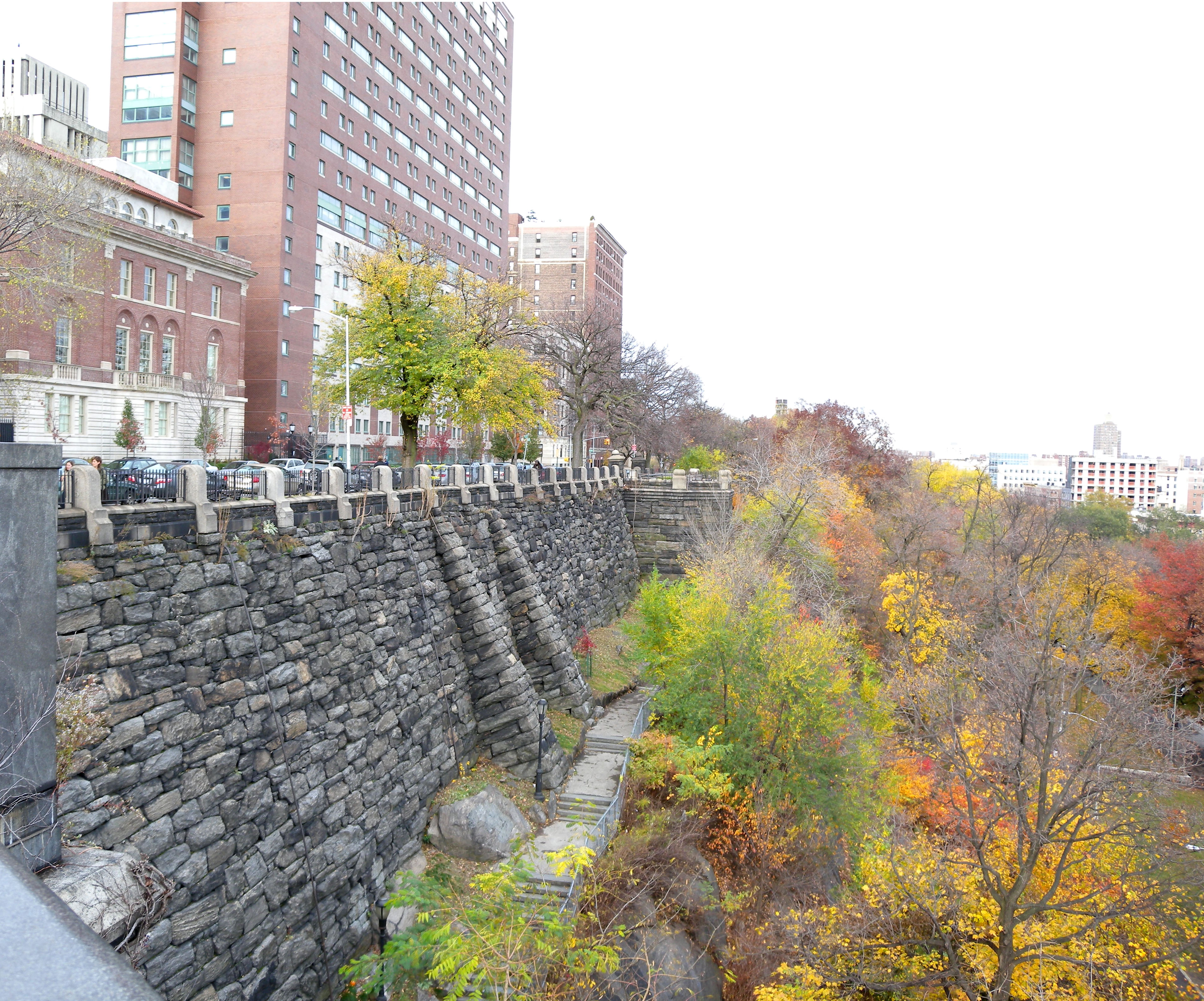
Columbia University buildings across Morningside Drive, seen from a scenic overlook within Morningside Park

Morningside Drive is a roughly north–south bi-directional street in the Morningside Heights neighborhood of the New York City borough of Manhattan. It runs from 110th Street in the south, where it forms the continuation of Columbus Avenue, to 122nd Street-Seminary Row in the north, which Morningside Drive becomes after turning to the west and crossing over Amsterdam Avenue.

Along the way, Morningside Drive passes the apse of the Cathedral of St. John the Divine; the Plant and Scrymser Pavilions of St. Luke's Hospital; the Eglise de Notre Dame; and several buildings owned by Columbia University, including the President's House and the East Campus dormitory. The eastern side of Morningside Drive is occupied by Morningside Park, which forms the eastern boundary of Morningside Heights, and contains a cliff that makes the construction of cross-streets impossible. The non-institutional buildings on the west side of the street are primarily apartment houses.

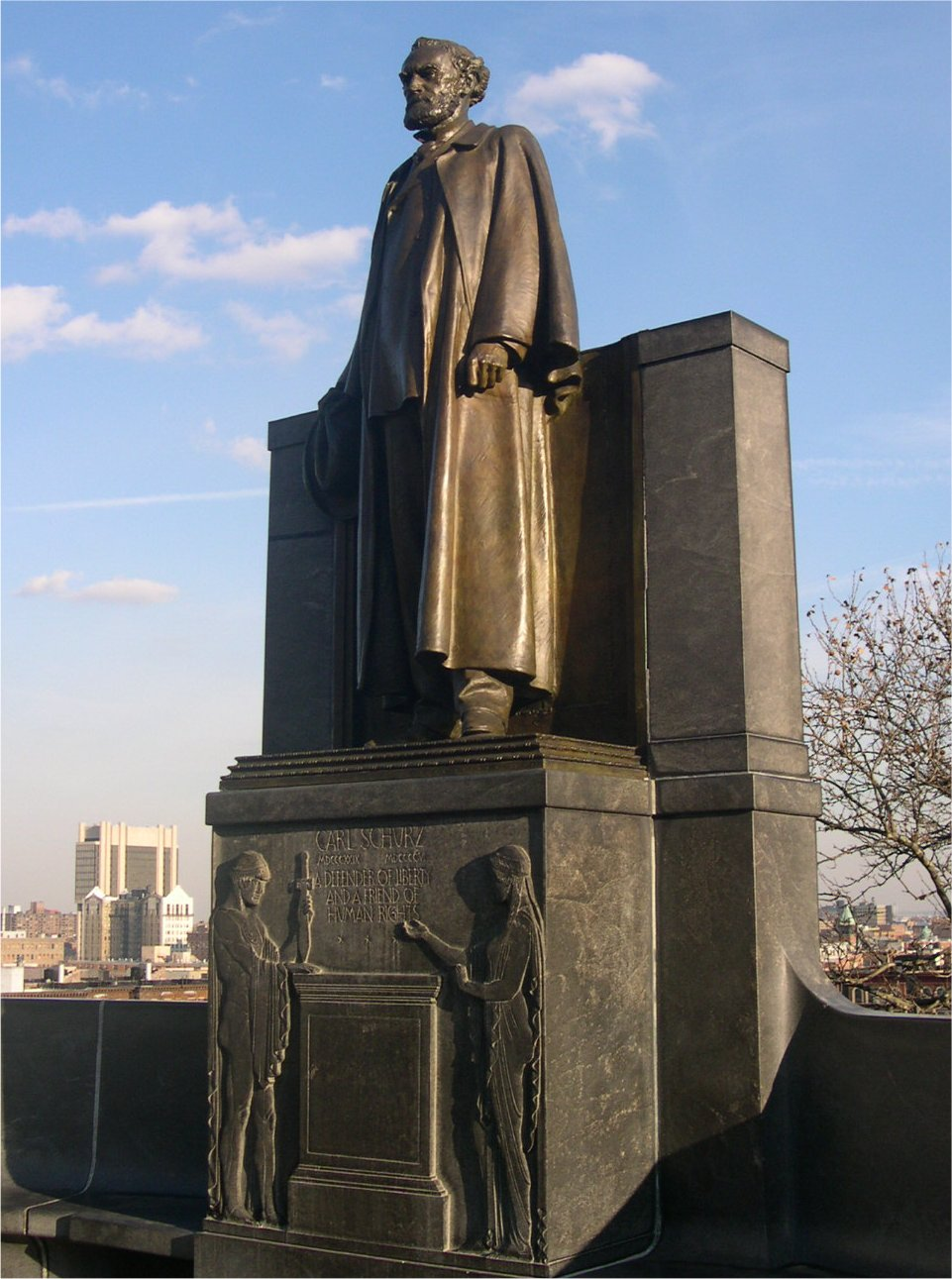
Carl Schurz statue on Morningside Drive
