= Martha Peterson (academic administrator) =

American academic administrator

President of Beloit College
- In office 1975–1981
- Preceded by: Miller Upton
- Succeeded by: Roger Harold Hull

President of Barnard College
- In office 1967–1975
- Preceded by: Rosemary Park
- Succeeded by: Jacquelyn Mattfeld

Personal details
- Born: Martha Elizabeth Peterson; June 22, 1916 Jamestown, Kansas
- Died: July 14, 2006 (aged 90) Madison, Wisconsin
- Education: University of Kansas
- Profession: Academic administrator

Martha Elizabeth Peterson (June 22, 1916 – July 14, 2006) was an American academic administrator. She served as president of Barnard College (1967–1975) and Beloit College (1975–1981).

== Biography ==
Peterson was born on June 22, 1916, outside Jamestown, Kansas, the daughter of a wheat farmer and a news reporter. She graduated from the University of Kansas in 1937.

After teaching high school mathematics for a few years, Peterson returned to the University of Kansas and earned a master's degree in educational psychology in 1943. She was named assistant dean of women after teaching mathematics at the university and was promoted dean of women in 1952.

In 1957, Peterson was appointed dean of women at the University of Wisconsin–Madison and later dean for student affairs in 1963. She also earned a PhD in educational psychology from Kansas in the meantime.

In 1967, Peterson was named seventh president of Barnard College. She presided over the college during the Columbia University protests of 1968. As president of Barnard, she worked out an arrangement with Columbia on allowing students from both schools to take an unlimited number of classes at the other school while retaining Barnard's autonomy from Columbia.

Peterson then served as president of Beloit College from 1975 to 1981. She helped restore financial stability to the college at a time when enrollment and endowment were both shrinking.

Peterson died on July 14, 2006, at age 90, at her home in Madison, Wisconsin. She was survived by her companion, University of Wisconsin Medical School professor Dr. Maxine Bennett.
