= Millicent Carey McIntosh =

American educational administrator and feminist (1898–2001)

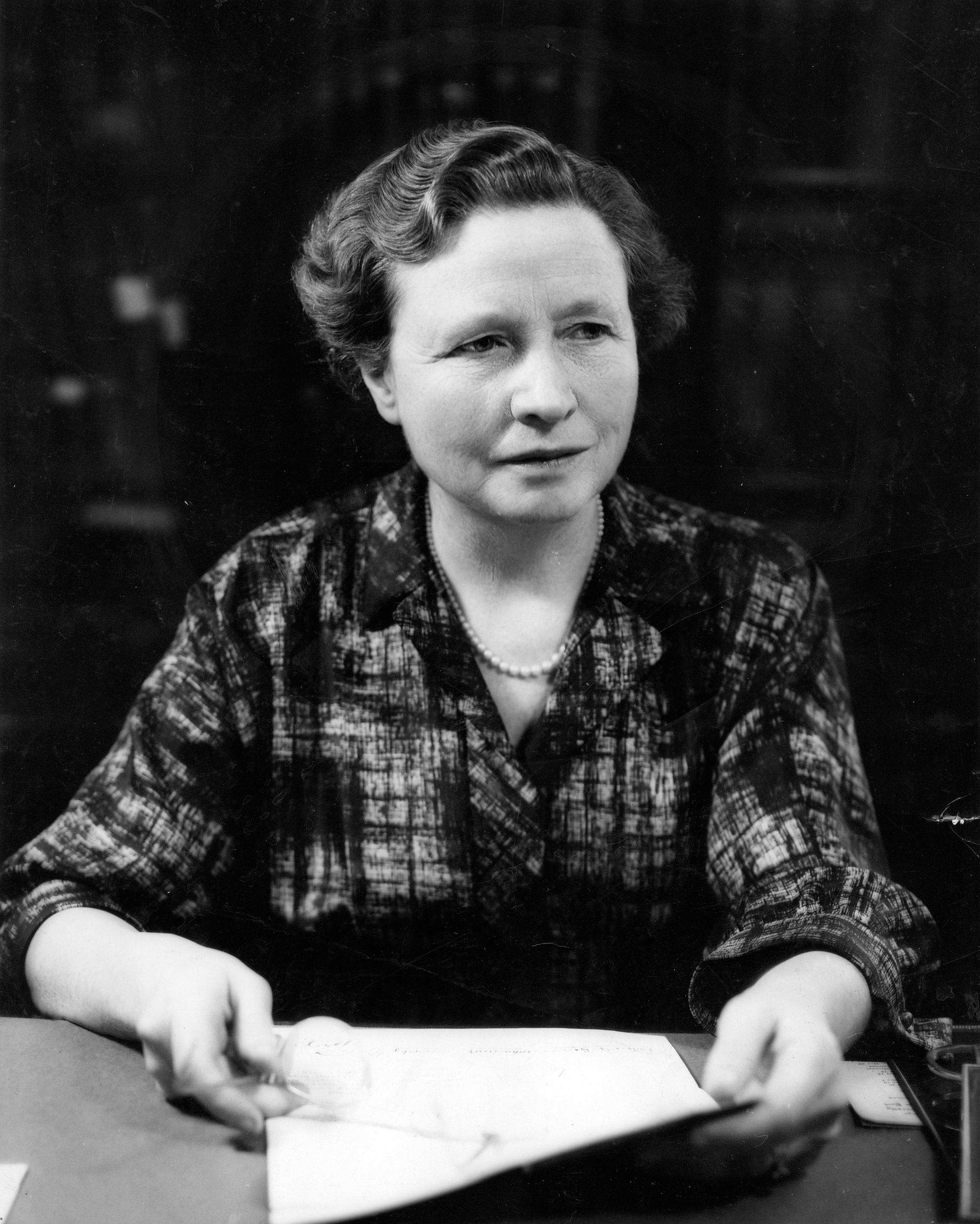
Millicent Carey McIntosh, circa 1956

Millicent Carey McIntosh (November 30, 1898 – January 3, 2001) was an educational administrator and American feminist who led the Brearley School from 1930 to 1947, and Barnard College from 1947 to 1962. The first married woman to head one of the Seven Sisters, she was "considered a national role model for generations of young women who wanted to combine career and family," advocating for working mothers and for child care as a dignified profession.

== Early life ==
McIntosh was born in Baltimore, Maryland on November 30, 1898 to Anthony Morris Carey and Margaret Cheston Thomas, both active Quakers. She was also a Quaker. Her mother was in the first graduating class of Bryn Mawr College in 1889. Her aunt, M. Carey Thomas, also a leader in women's education, founded the Bryn Mawr School in Baltimore and served as the president of Bryn Mawr College.

McIntosh attended Bryn Mawr College for her undergraduate, majoring in Greek and English and graduating in 1920 magna cum laude. After graduating, she worked for the YWCA as a social worker in Baltimore, and acted as a summer school tutor at Bryn Mawr in 1922, then moved to study abroad upon the suggestion of her aunt. McIntosh studied economics at Cambridge University, and earned an English Ph.D. from Johns Hopkins University with a dissertation on 14th century mystery plays. After graduating with her Ph.D. in 1926, McIntosh became an assistant professor of English at Bryn Mawr College. Shortly afterward, she was appointed dean of freshman and then acting dean of the college. In 1930, she was appointed as the headmistress for the Brearley School, a position she held for seventeen years. She converted the school from a half-day format to full-day, and pioneered a sex education class for sixth grade students at Brearley.

In 1932, she married pediatrician Rustin McIntosh, with whom she had five children.

== Barnard career ==
McIntosh became Dean of Barnard College in 1947, and became the institution's first President in 1952. As the president, McIntosh doubled Barnard's endowment and was able to increase faculty salaries by initiating Operation Bootstrap, a campaign that solicited funding from alumnae and donors like John D. Rockefeller. She helped to centralize the Barnard Fund and begin forming long-term development plans for the school, which allowed for the renovation of Milbank Hall and the construction of the Minor Latham Playhouse, Lehman Hall, and Reid Hall. She funded more merit scholarships from the school's endowment, opening the college to many underrepresented groups. McIntosh worked closely with Columbia presidents Dwight D. Eisenhower and Grayson Kirk during her tenure. In 1948, she was awarded the Roosevelt Medal of Honor. She was elected a Fellow of the American Academy of Arts and Sciences in 1966. McIntosh also volunteered as a trustee of the New York Public Library, and was the first woman to sit on the board of CBS.

McIntosh retired in 1962 and was replaced by Rosemary Park. After Barnard, she helped to found Kirkland College in the 1960s, serving as the chair of the founding advisory board.

In 1992, she received the Barnard College Medal of Distinction.
