= Feltz =

Feltz is a surname. Notable people with the surname include:

- Deborah Feltz, American kinesiologist and sport psychologist
- Eberhard Feltz (born 1937), German classical violinist
- Kurt Feltz (1910–1982), German poet
- Vanessa Feltz (born 1962), British broadcaster
