= Amy Hwang =

American cartoonist

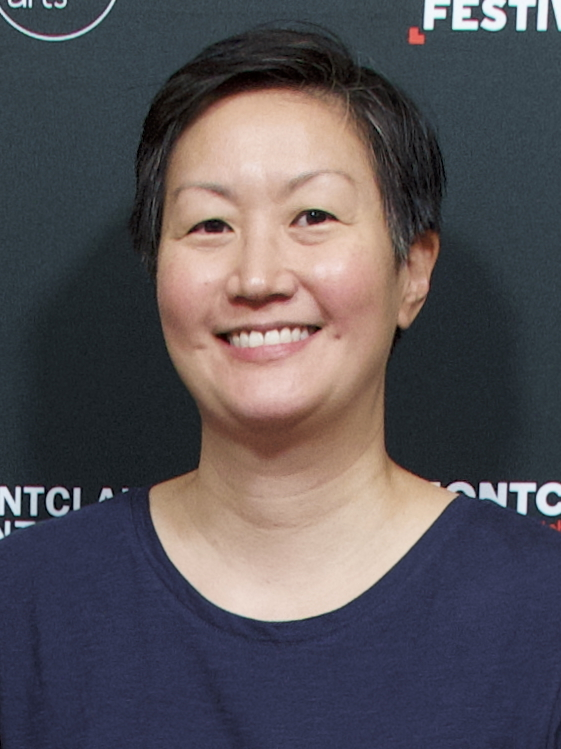
- Hwang at the 2025 Montclair Film Festival
- Born: Arlington, Texas
- Education: Barnard College
- Occupation: cartoonist
- Known for: The New Yorker cartoons
- Website: https://www.amyhwang.com/

Amy Hwang is a cartoonist for The New Yorker and is probably the first Asian woman to have drawn cartoons openly for the magazine.

Hwang was born in Arlington, Texas. She graduated from Barnard College in 2000 with a degree in architecture. As a first-year at Barnard, Hwang started drawing cartoons for the Columbia Daily Spectator in 1997. After graduating, she worked at an architecture firm, which she later left so that she could become a cartoonist full-time. She has worked as a cartoonist with The New Yorker since 2010. Hwang won National Cartoonists Society's 2019 Silver Reuben Award for gag cartoons. She also curated an art exhibit with the cartoonist Jeremy Nguyen called "Asian Babies: Works from Asian 'New Yorker' Cartoonists". The exhibit ran from October 4, 2019, to January 12, 2020, at Pearl River Mart, where Hwang held an artist-in-residence position. The exhibit featured the works of ten cartoonists of Asian descent, including Monroe Leung, the first Asian American cartoonist to be published in The New Yorker. In 2021, Hwang spoke on a virtual New Yorker Festival panel titled "Some Very Funny Ladies" alongside Liza Donnelly, Roz Chast and Liana Finck. Hwang is mentioned in Liza Donnelly's 2022 book, Very Funny Ladies: The New Yorker’s Women Cartoonists.

Hwang's cartoon style predominantly consists of clean lines, soft gray washes, with pen and ink on paper.
