= Sian Beilock =

American cognitive scientist (born 1976)

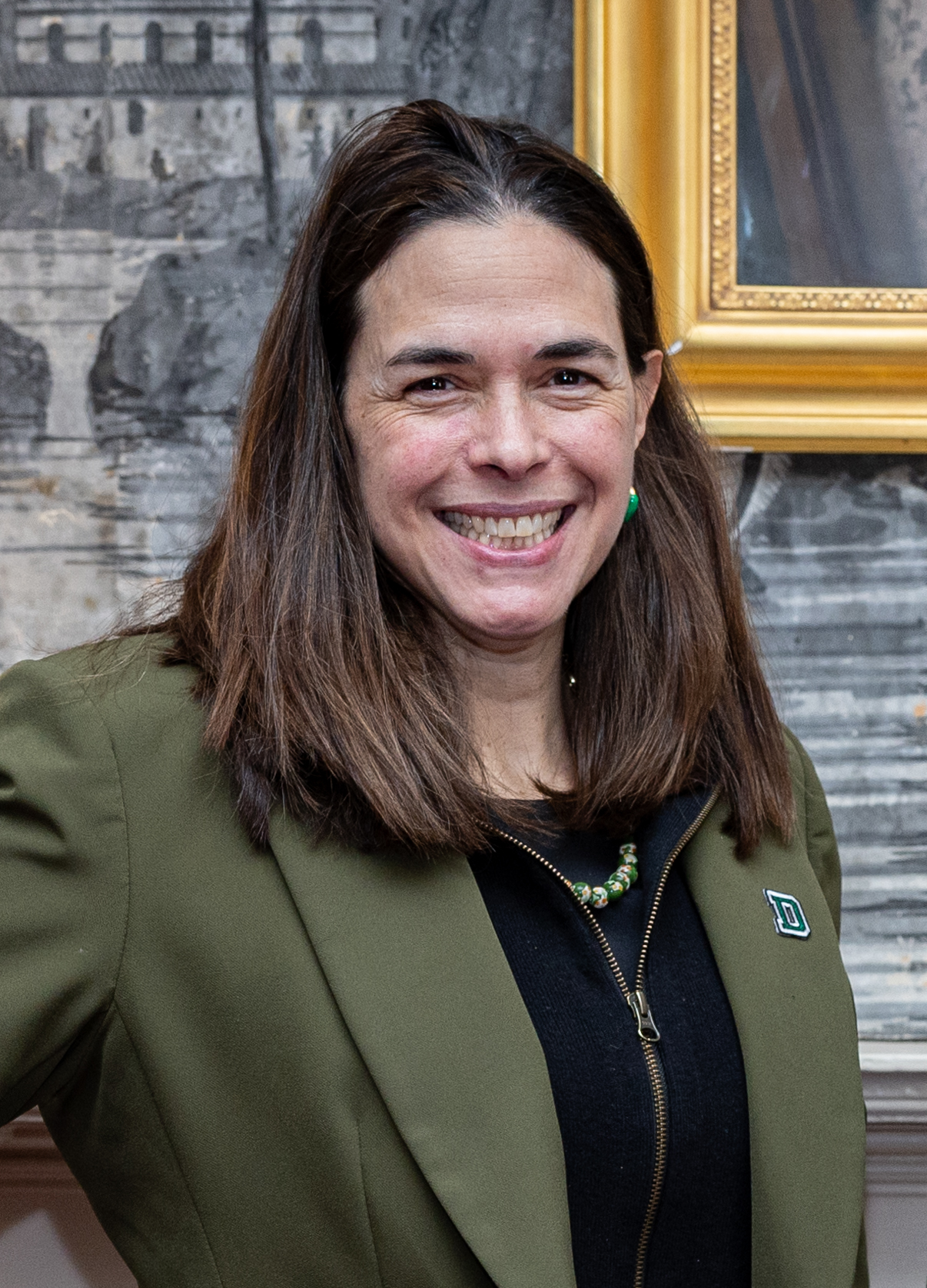
- Beilock in 2024

19th President of Dartmouth College
- Incumbent
- Assumed office June 12, 2023
- Preceded by: Philip J. Hanlon

8th President of Barnard College
- In office July 1, 2017 – June 2023
- Preceded by: Debora Spar
- Succeeded by: Laura Rosenbury

Personal details
- Born: January 10, 1976 (age 50) Berkeley, California, U.S.
- Education: University of California, San Diego (BS); Michigan State University (MS, PhD)
- Scientific career
- Awards: Troland Research Award (2017)
- Fields: Psychology; Kinesiology
- Workplaces: Miami University; University of Chicago; Barnard College; Dartmouth College
- Thesis: When performance fails: Expertise, attention, and performance under pressure (2003)
- Doctoral advisors: Thomas Carr; Deborah Feltz

Sian Leah Beilock (/ˈsiən ˈbaɪlɒk/ SEE-ən BY-lok; born January 10, 1976) is an American cognitive scientist who is the president of Dartmouth College in Hanover, New Hampshire. Before Dartmouth, she was the president of Barnard College in Manhattan, New York. She was previously the Stella M. Rowley Professor of Psychology and executive vice provost at the University of Chicago.

== Early and personal life ==
Beilock was born in Berkeley, California. Her parents were lawyers. She is Jewish. She was named after Welsh actress Siân Phillips, whom her parents had seen as a suffragette in the BBC miniseries Shoulder to Shoulder. Her parents did not know how to pronounce Phillips' first name; consequently, her own name's pronunciation differs.

Beilock attended a private school until second grade, when she opted to move to public school. She played several sports at Piedmont High School and excelled in soccer, but when she was 16 she played a poor game as a goalkeeper in front of coaches from the national team, and never played again. She often mentioned this experience in her research on pressure "Being able to pivot and not get bogged down in something going wrong—that’s such an important skill." Beilock wanted to attend university on the East coast, but remained in California due to her father's leukemia diagnosis.

As of 2023, Beilock had one daughter with her long-term partner.

== Education ==
Beilock graduated from the University of California, San Diego in 1997 with a B.S. in cognitive science and a minor in psychology. She received her M.S. and Ph.D. in kinesiology and psychology from Michigan State University in East Lansing in 2003. Her dissertation was titled When Performance Fails: Expertise, Attention, and Performance Under Pressure. Her doctoral advisors were Thomas H. Carr and Deborah Feltz.

== Career ==
During her Ph.D. research and afterwards, Beilock explored differences between novice and expert athletic performances. Later in her career, her research focused on why people perform poorly in stressful academic situations, such as taking a high-stakes mathematics exam. She found that worries during those situations rob individuals of the working memory or cognitive horsepower they would normally have to focus. Because people who have additional working memory rely more on their brainpower, they can be affected to a greater extent in stressful academic situations. Her work demonstrated that stressful situations during tests might diminish meaningful differences between students that under less stressful situations might exhibit greater differences in performance.

Beilock's research also relates to educational practice and policy. Her work found that students' attitudes and anxieties and those of their teachers are critical to student success. She has developed simple psychological interventions to help people perform their best under stress.

From 2003 to 2005, Beilock was an assistant professor in the Department of Psychology at Miami University in Oxford, Ohio. She was on the faculty at the University of Chicago from 2005 until 2017, where she became the Stella M. Rowley Professor of Psychology and Executive Vice Provost.^{[5]}

=== Barnard College president ===
On July 1, 2017, she became the 8th president of Barnard College, a position she held until June 2023.

During her first year at Barnard, there was a Boycott, Divestment and Sanctions (BDS) referendum related to Israel, which Beilock came out against. She noted that supporting the referendum "could potentially [suppress] discourse on campus and that people have different views about Israel and the policies of Israel, and I wouldn’t want to do anything as an institution that would send a signal that some people couldn’t talk about those views."

=== Dartmouth College president ===
Beilock became the first woman to lead Dartmouth College, beginning her tenure as president on June 12, 2023. She said that her focus is on improving student mental health and fostering free speech and open dialogue on campus. In October 2023, she launched “Commitment to Care: Dartmouth’s Plan for Student Mental Health and Well-Being”, and later hired the institution’s inaugural chief health and wellness officer to oversee campus health and well-being for students, faculty and staff. Beilock also convened a panel hosted by CNN’s Sanjay Gupta featuring U.S. Surgeon General Vivek Murthy and all of his living predecessors to discuss the nation’s mental health crisis on September 28, 2023.

In 2023, Beilock introduced a time away policy geared toward students who need to take a leave of absence during their studies.

In February 2024, Beilock reinstated the SAT/ACT requirement for undergraduate admissions, becoming the first Ivy League president to do so following a trend of test-optional policies adopted during the COVID-19 pandemic. In a message to the Dartmouth community, she wrote that “the decision was guided by social science research that suggests we can improve our ability to identify students from a wide range of economic backgrounds who will succeed at Dartmouth.”

In April 2024, she announced the creation of the Dartmouth Climate Collaboration, pledging 500 million dollars towards the goal of eliminating carbon emissions on campus by 2050. The plan includes the installation of high-capacity heat pumps and a geoexchange system.

In October 2024, Beilock pledged that she would add 1,000 housing units for students, faculty and staff to campus within ten years. The initiative kicked off with a thirty-million-dollar donation from two alumni.

==== Palestinian protests ====
Several incidents, including the arrests of two student protestors and free-speech concerns around monitoring of student communications, occurred early in her tenure. After a series of forums by Jewish Studies and Middle Eastern Studies faculty, the college launched Dartmouth Dialogues in January 2024 to model productive conversations on divisive issues; build skills around empathetic listening, emotional management and conversation navigation; and encourage connection among students, faculty and staff members.

In May 2024, approximately 90 students, faculty and community members who were nonviolently protesting the Gaza war were taken into custody by the New Hampshire State Police. Two student journalists from The Dartmouth reporting on the protest were among the arrested, though their charges were dropped within days. Following the arrests, the New York Times described Dartmouth as having "stood out for its almost instantaneous response to a nonviolent protest."

In an email the day following the arrests, Beilock wrote that taking over the university’s shared spaces for ideological reasons is exclusionary and could lead to the intimidation of Jewish students. A week later, Beilock stood by her decision "to ask the Hanover Police Department for help taking down the encampment" but noted she was "sorry for the harm this impossible decision has caused." Liz Cahill Lempres, Dartmouth’s board chair, said that the entire board of trustees was unequivocally in support of Beilock's actions.

On May 15, Dartmouth's undergraduate student body voted no confidence in Beilock. On May 20, Beilock was censured by a vote of 183 to 163 by the Dartmouth Faculty of Arts and Sciences over her response to the May 1 campus protest.

Dartmouth is the only Ivy League college that has not faced a federal civil rights investigation over its handling of allegations of antisemitism and Islamophobia on campus.

== See also ==
- Wheelock Succession

== Works ==
- Beilock, Sian (2010). Choke: What the Secrets of the Brain Reveal About Getting It Right When You Have To (First hardcover ed.). New York: Free Press. ISBN 9781416596172. OCLC 1466401460.
- Beilock, Sian (2015). How the Body Knows Its Mind: The Surprising Power of the Physical Environment to Influence How You Think and Feel (First hardcover ed.). New York: Atria Books. ISBN 9781451626681. OCLC 874557752.
