= Barnard College =

Private women's college in New York City

- Latin: Barnardi Collegium
- Motto: Ἑπομένη τῷ λογισμῷ (Greek)
- Motto in English: Following the Way of Reason
- Type: Private women's liberal arts college
- Established: 1889; 137 years ago
- Parent institution: Columbia University
- Academic affiliations: COFHE; NAICU; Oberlin Group; Seven Sisters; space-grant
- Endowment: $557.1 million (2025)
- President: Laura Rosenbury
- Provost: Rebecca L. Walkowitz
- Faculty: 388 (fall 2022)
- Undergraduates: 3,442 (fall 2022)
- Location: New York City, United States; 40.8096°N 73.9635°W
- Campus: Urban
- Colors: Blue and white
- Sporting affiliations: NCAA Division I – Ivy League (consortium with Columbia University)
- Mascot: Millie the Bear
- Website: barnard.edu
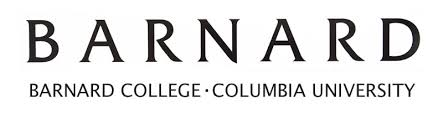

Barnard College is a private women's liberal arts college in New York City, United States. It is affiliated with Columbia University and was founded in 1889 by a group of women led by young student activist Annie Nathan Meyer, who petitioned Columbia University's trustees to create an affiliated college named after university president Frederick A. P. Barnard. The college is one of the original Seven Sisters—seven liberal arts colleges in the Northeastern United States that were historically women's colleges.

Barnard College has independent admission, curricula, and finances separate from Columbia. It shares sports teams with Columbia through the Columbia–Barnard Athletic Consortium, an agreement that makes Barnard the only women's college to compete in NCAA Division I athletics.

Barnard College offers Bachelor of Arts degree programs in about 50 areas of study. In addition to Columbia, students may also pursue elements of their education at the Juilliard School, the Manhattan School of Music, and the Jewish Theological Seminary which are also based in New York City. Its 4-acre (1.6 ha) campus is located in the Upper Manhattan neighborhood of Morningside Heights, stretching along Broadway between 116th and 120th Streets. It is directly across from Columbia's main campus.

Barnard College faculty and alumnae have been recipients of Emmy, Tony, Grammy, Academy, Peabody awards, Dan David Prize, Guggenheim Fellowships, MacArthur Fellowships, the Presidential Medal of Freedom, the National Medal of Science, and the Pulitzer Prize. Barnard alumnae include leaders in science, religion, politics, the Peace Corps, medicine, law, education, communications, theater, and business.

== History ==
=== Founding ===
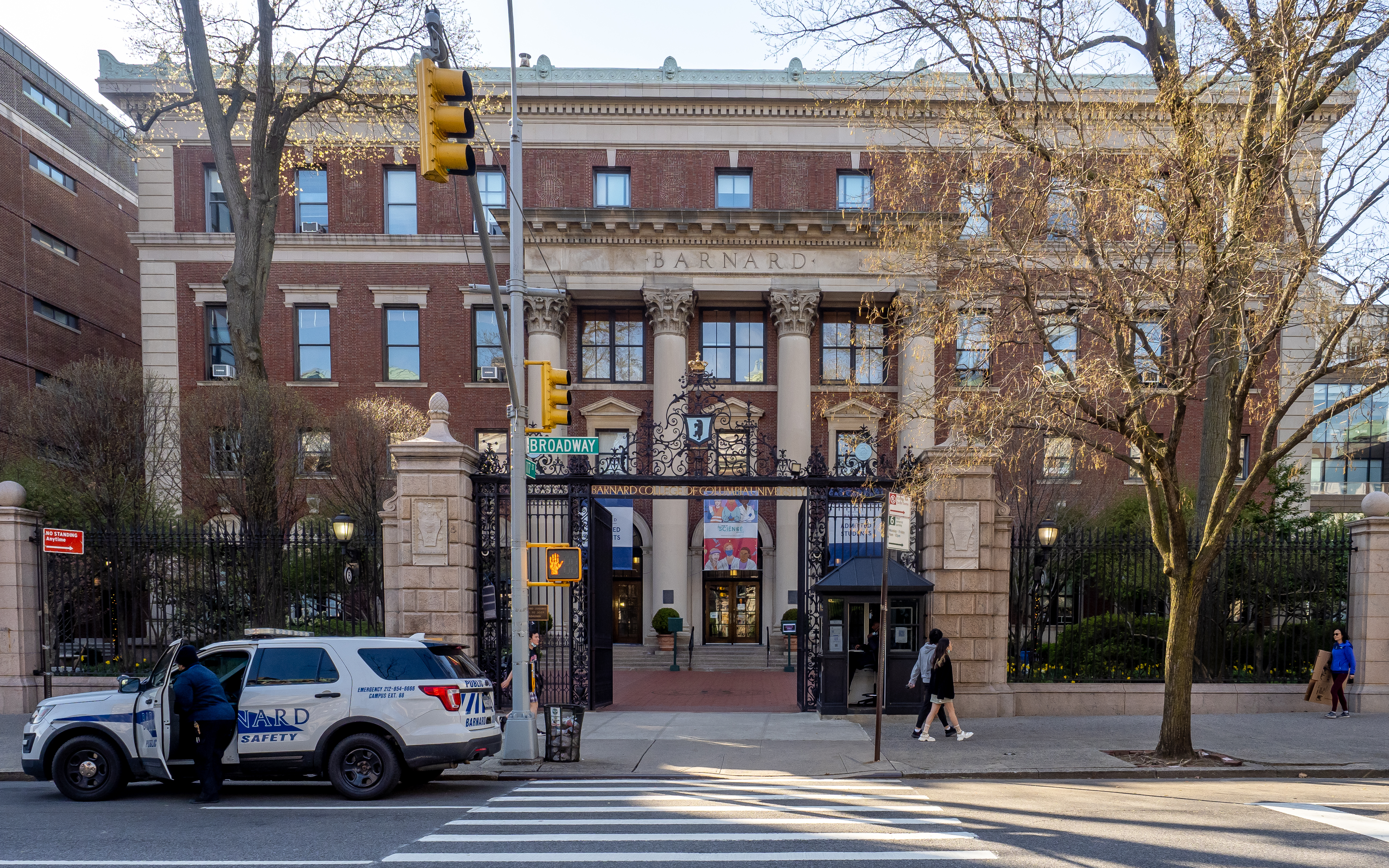
Barnard College of Columbia University main entrance gate

From its founding in 1754 until the mid-1980s, Columbia College of Columbia University admitted only men for undergraduate study. Barnard College was founded in 1889 as a response to Columbia's refusal to admit women. Classes took place in a rented brownstone at 343 Madison Avenue, where a faculty of six offered instruction to 36 students.

The college was named after Frederick Augustus Porter Barnard, a deaf American educator and mathematician who later served as Columbia's president for over twenty years. He advocated for coeducational settings and proposed in 1879 that Columbia admit women. Columbia's Board of Trustees repeatedly rejected Barnard's suggestion, but in 1883 agreed to create a syllabus that would allow the college's students to receive degrees. The first such graduate received her bachelor's degree in 1887. A former student of the program, Annie Meyer, and other prominent New York women persuaded the board in 1889 to create a women's college connected to Columbia. Men and women were evenly represented among the founding trustees of Barnard College.

=== Morningside campus ===
When Columbia University announced in 1892 its impending move to Morningside Heights, Barnard built a new campus nearby with gifts from Mary E. Brinckerhoff, Elizabeth Milbank Anderson and Martha Fiske. Two of these gifts were made with several stipulations attached. Brinckerhoff insisted that Barnard acquire land within 1,000 feet of the Columbia campus within the next four years. The Barnard trustees purchased land between 119th–120th Streets after receiving funds for that purpose in 1895. Anderson requested that Charles A. Rich be hired. Rich designed the Milbank, Brinckerhoff, and Fiske Halls, built in 1897–1898; these were listed on the National Register of Historic Places in 2003. The first classes at the new campus were held in 1897. Despite Brinckerhoff's, Anderson's, and Fiske's gifts, Barnard remained in debt.

Ella Weed supervised the college in its first four years; Emily James Smith succeeded her as Barnard's first dean. Jessica Finch is credited with coining the phrase current events while teaching at Barnard College in the 1890s.

The college received the three blocks south of 119th Street from Anderson in 1903. Rich provided a master plan for the campus, but only Brooks Hall was built, being constructed between 1906 and 1908. None of Rich's other plans was carried out. Students' Hall, now known as Barnard Hall, was built in 1916 to a design by Arnold Brunner. Hewitt Hall was the last structure to be erected, in 1926–1927. All three buildings were listed on the National Register of Historic Places in 2003.

By the mid-20th century, Barnard had succeeded in its original goal of providing a top-tier education to women. Between 1920 and 1974, only the much larger Hunter College and University of California, Berkeley produced more women graduates who later received doctorates. In the 1970s, Barnard faced considerable pressure to merge with male only Columbia College, which was fiercely resisted by its president, Jacquelyn Mattfeld.

=== Presidents ===
List of presidents and deans of Barnard College from 1889 to present:

No.	Image	President	Term started	Term ended	Refs.
Chair of the academic committee of Barnard College (1889–1894)
1		Ella Weed	1889	January 10, 1894 (Note: Died in office)	
Deans of Barnard College (1894–1952)
2		Emily James Smith Putnam	May 11, 1894	February 1, 1900	
3		Laura Drake Gill	January 1901	June 1907	
interim		Willian Tenney Brewster	1907	1911	
4		Virginia Gildersleeve	February 1911	1947	
Presidents of Barnard College (1952–present)
5		Millicent McIntosh	1947	June 1962	
6		Rosemary Park	July 1962	June 1967	
interim		Henry Boorse (Note: Dean of Faculty)	July 1967	November 1967	
7		Martha Peterson	November 1967	May 1975 (Note: Resigned to lead Beloit College.)	
interim		Leroy Breunig (Note: Dean of Faculty)	May 1975	June 1976	
8		Jacquelyn Mattfeld	June 1976	May 29, 1980	
acting		Ellen V. Futter	1980	April 1981	
9		Ellen V. Futter	April 1981	October 1993 (Note: Resigned to lead the American Museum of Natural History.)	
interim		Kathryn Rodgers	July 1993	April 1994	
10		Judith R. Shapiro	July 1, 1994	June 30, 2008	
11		Debora L. Spar	July 1, 2008	March 5, 2017 (Note: Resigned to lead the Lincoln Center.)	
interim		Robert Goldberg	March 6, 2017	June 30, 2017	
12		Sian Beilock	July 1, 2017	June 11, 2023 (Note: Resigned to lead Dartmouth College.)	
13		Laura Rosenbury	June 12, 2023	present	

Table notes:

== Academics ==
Barnard students are able to pursue a bachelor of arts degree in about 50 areas of study. Joint programs for the bachelor of science and other degrees exist with Columbia University, Juilliard School, and the Jewish Theological Seminary. The most popular majors at the college by 2021 graduates were:

Econometrics and Quantitative Economics (62)
Research and Experimental Psychology (56)
History (43)
English Language and Literature (39)
Political Science and Government (36)
Neuroscience (33)
Art History, Criticism and Conservation (33)

The liberal arts general education requirements are collectively called Foundations. Students must take two courses in the sciences (one of which must be accompanied by a laboratory course), study a single foreign language for two semesters, and take two courses in the arts/humanities as well as two in the social sciences. In addition, students must complete at least one three-credit course in the so-called "Modes of Thinking" series, and fulfill other requirements.

=== Admissions ===
Enrolled first-year student statistics
	2022	2021	2020	2019	2018
Applicants	12,009	10,395	9,411	9,320	7,897
Admits	NA	1,084	1,022	1,097	1,099
Admit rate	6%	10%	10.8%	11.8%	13.9%
Enrolled	N/A	N/A	N/A	632	605
SAT mid-50% range	N/A	N/A	N/A	1360–1500	1330–1500
ACT mid-50% range	N/A	N/A	N/A	31–34	30–33

Admissions to Barnard are considered "most selective" by U.S. News & World Report. It is the most selective women's college in the nation; in 2017, Barnard had the lowest acceptance rate of the five Seven Sisters that remain single-sex in admissions.

The class of 2026's admission rate was 8% of the 12,009 applicants, the lowest acceptance rate in the institution's history. The median SAT composite score of enrolled students was 1440, with median subscores of 720 in Math and 715 in Evidence-Based Reading and Writing. The median ACT Composite score was 33.

In 2015, Barnard announced that it would admit transgender women who "consistently live and identify as women, regardless of the gender assigned to them at birth" and would continue to support and enroll those students who transitioned to male after they had already been admitted.

The college practices need-blind admission for domestic first-year applicants.

=== Rankings ===
Academic rankings

Liberal arts
- U.S. News & World Report: 14 (tie) of 211
- Washington Monthly: 63 of 194

National
- Forbes: 73 of 500
- WSJ/College Pulse: 50 of 600

In 2025, U.S. News & World Report ranked Barnard as tied at 13th of 211 U.S. liberal arts colleges overall. Barnard was tied for 30th for "Best Undergraduate Teaching" among U.S. liberal arts colleges by U.S. News & World Report. Forbes ranked Barnard 73rd of 500 colleges in 2023. In 2024, Washington Monthly ranked Barnard 63rd among 194 liberal arts colleges in the U.S. based on its contribution to the public good, as measured by social mobility, research, and promoting public service.

== Campus ==
=== Library ===
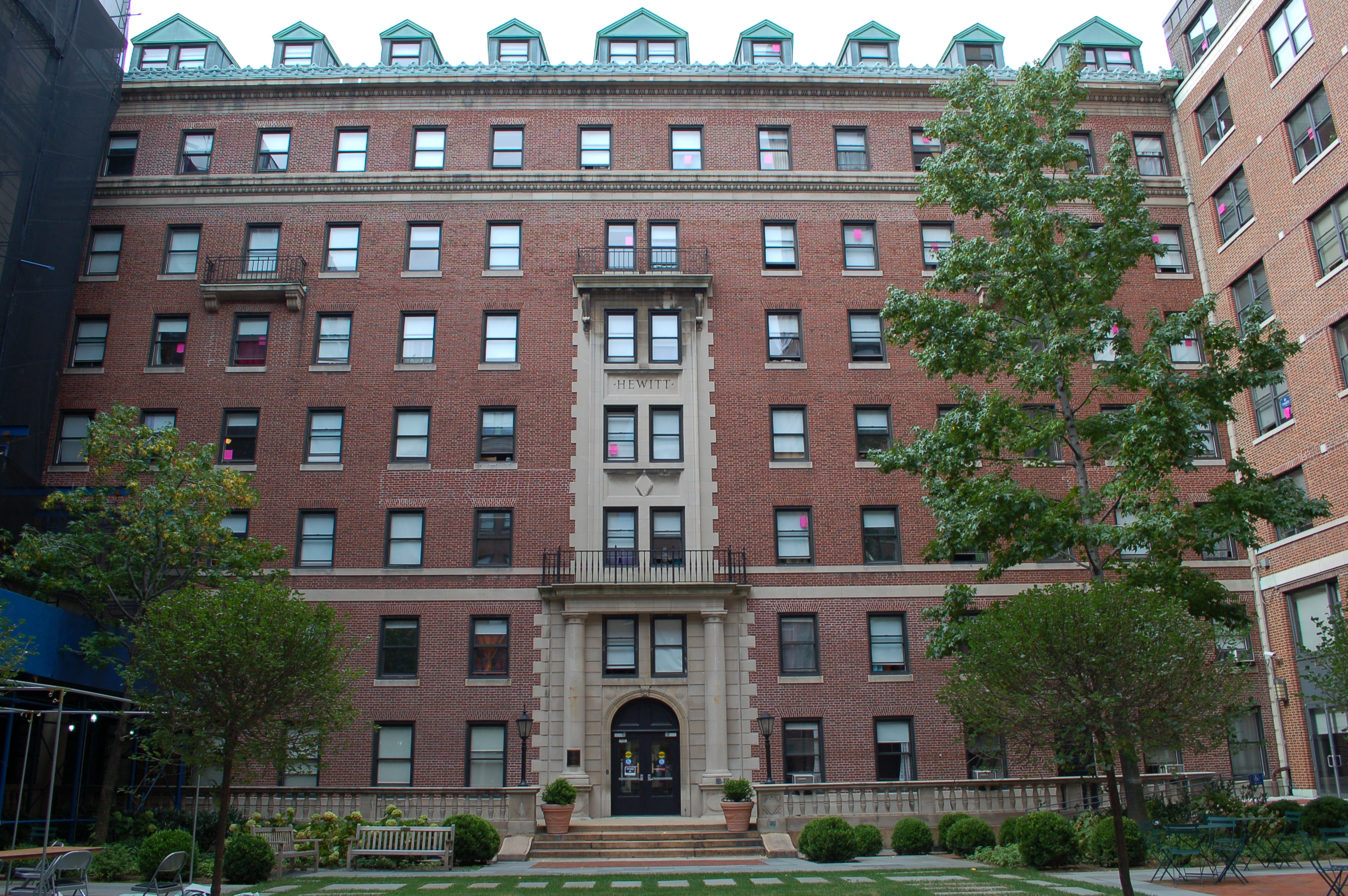
Hewitt Hall

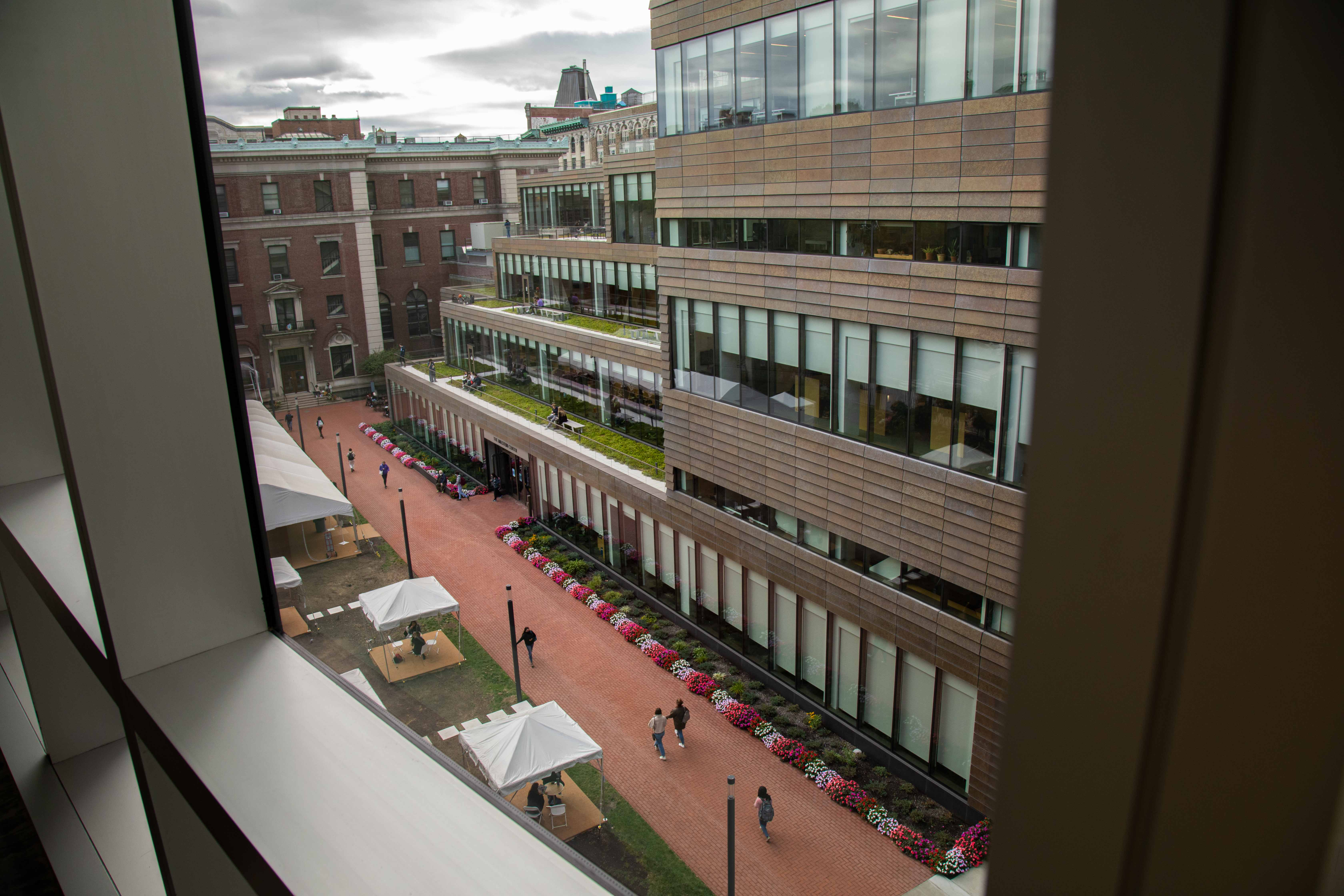
The Milstein Center for Teaching and Learning

While Barnard students have access to the libraries at Columbia University, the college has always maintained a library of its own. The Barnard Library also encompasses the Archives and Special Collections, with material that documents Barnard's history from its founding to the present day. Among the collections are the Ntozake Shange papers.

=== Zine collection ===
The Barnard Zine Library is a unit of the Barnard Library and Academic Information Systems (BLAIS). Zine collections target primarily female, default queer, intentionally of color, and gender expansive topics. In 2004, it became the first zine library in the United States to be fully cataloged in the OCLC. It opened for circulation in 2008, and holds roughly 5,000 processed zines as of 2018. The library supports the student-run Barnard Zine Club.

== Student life ==
=== Student organizations ===
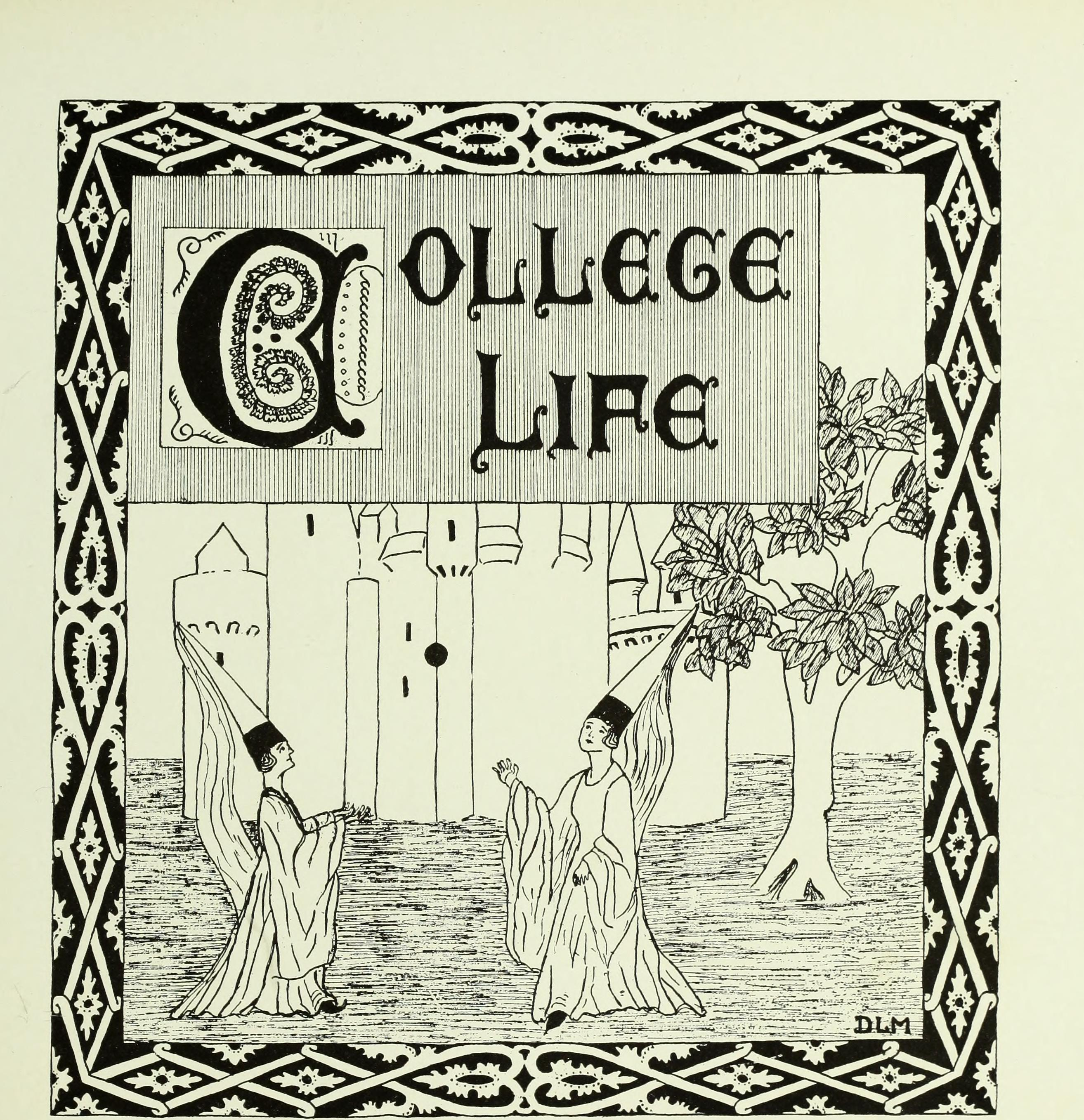
College life as depicted by the college's newspaper in 1923

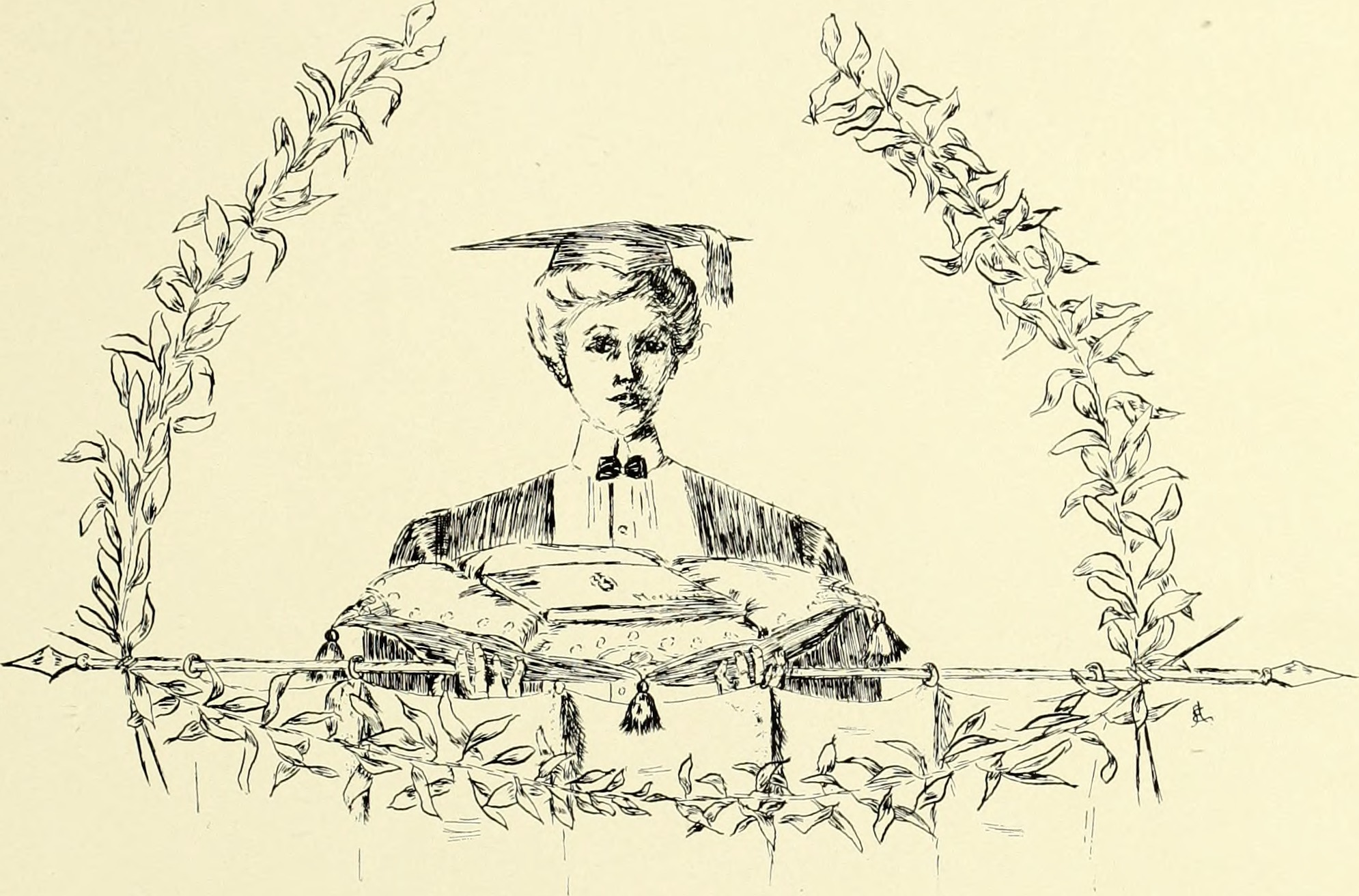
A 1902 depiction of a "modern" Barnard woman

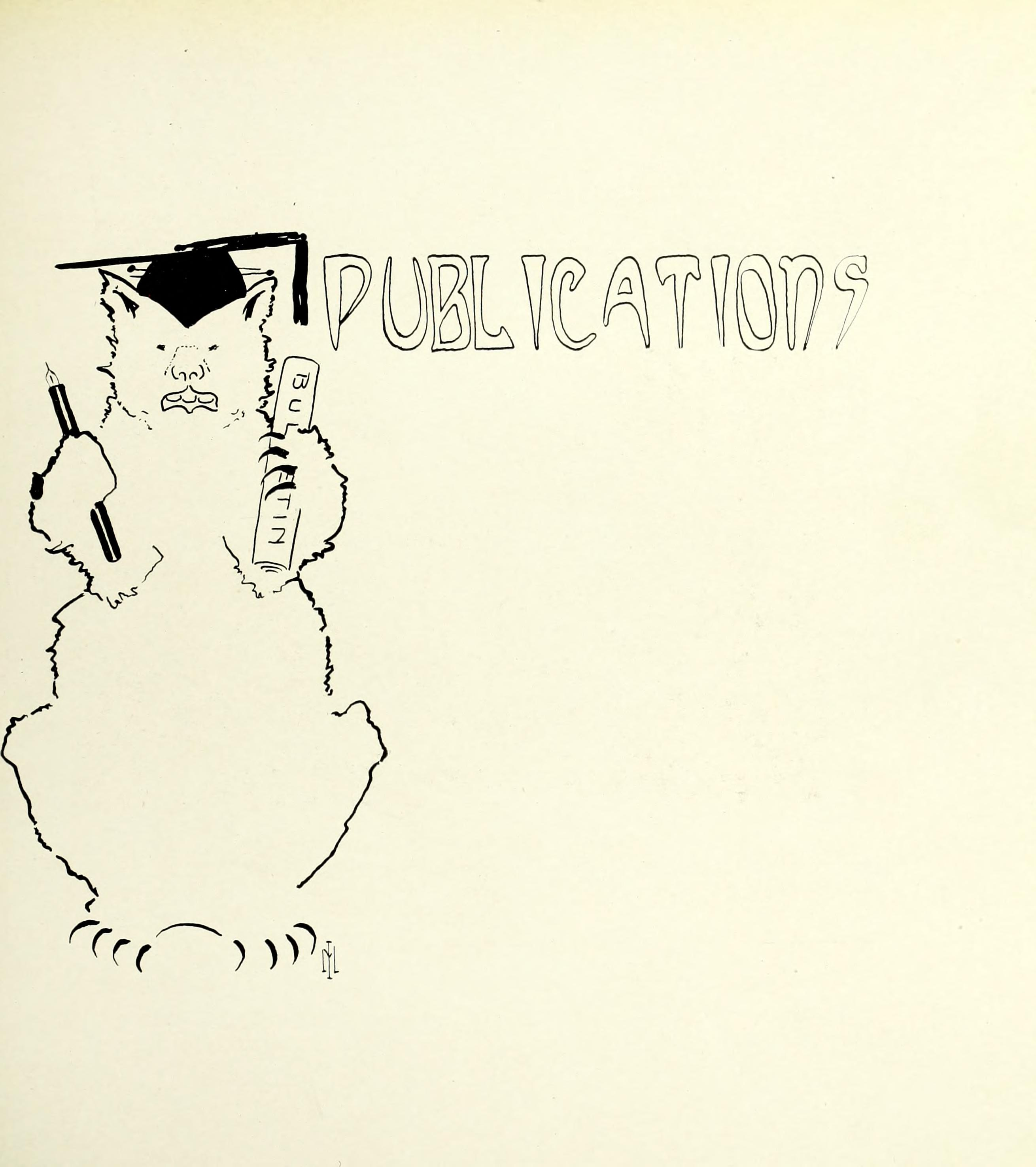
A depiction of the Barnard Bear, commonly referred to by students as Millie the Dancing Bear

Every Barnard student is part of the Student Government Association (SGA), which elects a representative student government. SGA aims to facilitate the expression of opinions on matters that directly affect the Barnard community.

Student groups include theater and vocal music groups, language clubs, literary magazines, a freeform radio station called WBAR, a biweekly magazine called the Barnard Bulletin, Club Q, community service groups, and others.

Barnard students can join extracurricular activities or organizations at Columbia University, while Columbia University students are allowed in most, but not all, Barnard organizations. Barnard's McIntosh Activities Council organizes various community focused events on campus, such as Big Sub and Midnight Breakfast. There are sub-committees focussed on cultural events (Mosaic), health and wellness (Wellness), networking (Network), event-planning (Community), and service (Action).

=== Sororities ===
Barnard students participate in various sororities. As of 2010, Barnard does not fully recognize the National Panhellenic Conference sororities at Columbia, despite it being home to the Alpha chapter of Alpha Omicron Pi, which was founded at Barnard in 1897, but it does provide some funding to account for Barnard students living in Columbia housing through these organizations.

=== Traditions ===
Barnard Greek Games: One of Barnard's oldest traditions, the Barnard Greek Games were first held in 1903, and occurred annually until the Columbia University protests in 1968. Since then they have been sporadically revived. The games consist of competitions between each graduating class at Barnard, and events have traditionally included Greek poetry recitation, dance, chariot racing, and a torch race.

Take Back the Night: Each April, Barnard and Columbia students participate in the Take Back the Night march and speak-out. This annual event grew out of a 1988 Seven Sisters conference. The march grew from less than 200 participants in 1988 to more than 2,500 in 2007.

Midnight breakfast marks the beginning of finals week. A long-standing college tradition, Midnight Breakfast is hosted by the student-run activities council, McAC (McIntosh Activities Council). In addition to providing standard breakfast foods, each year's theme is also incorporated into the menu. Past themes have included "I YUMM the 90s," "Grease," and "Take Me Out to the Ballgame." The event is a school-wide affair as college deans, trustees and the president serve food to about a thousand students. It takes place the night before finals begin every semester.

Big Sub: Toward the beginning of each fall semester, Barnard College supplies a 700+ feet long subway sandwich. Students from the college can take as much of the sub as they can carry. The sub has kosher, dairy free, vegetarian, and vegan sections. This event is organized by the student-run activities council, McAC.

== Academic affiliations ==
=== Relationship with Columbia University ===
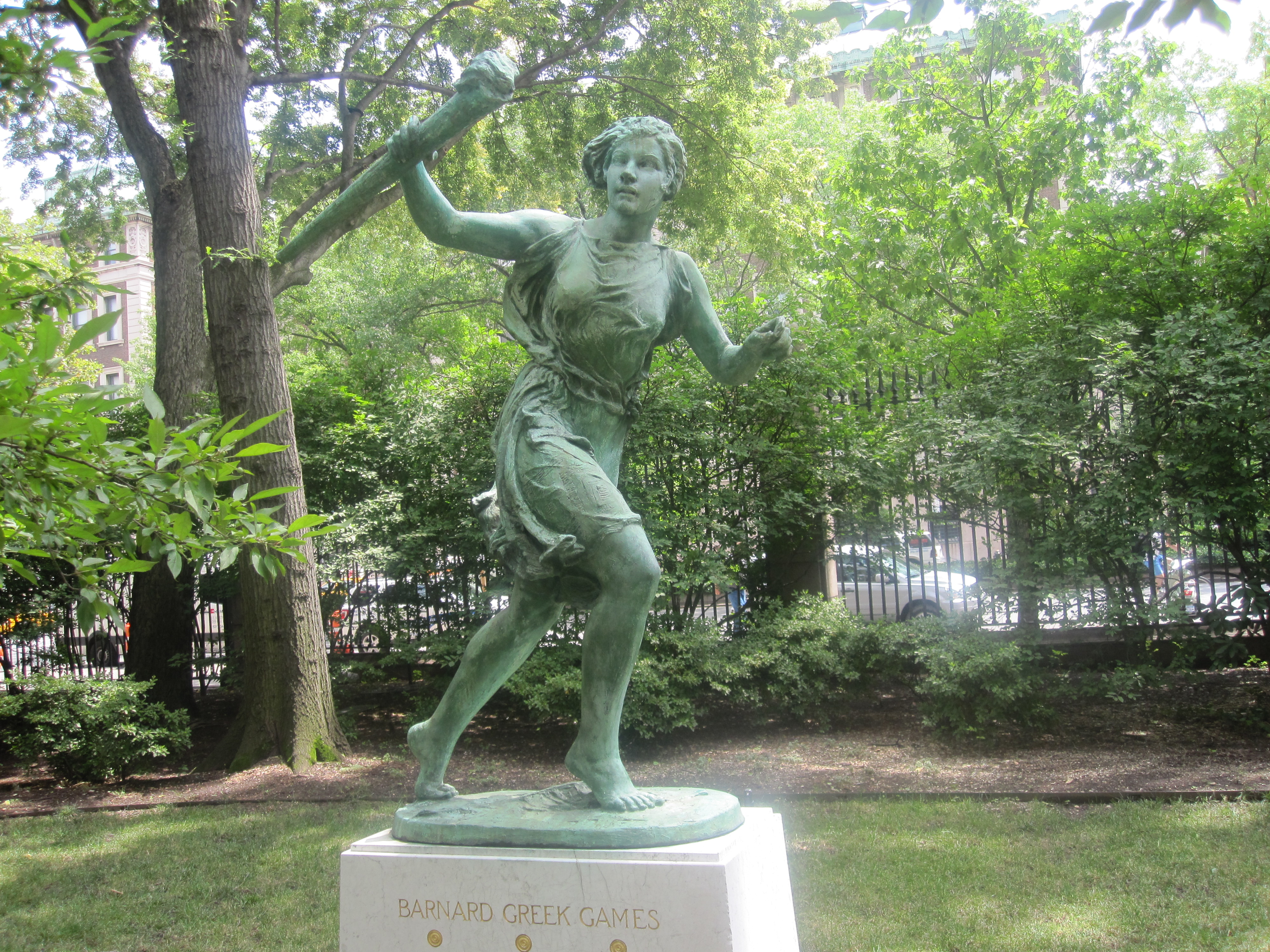
Greek Games statue

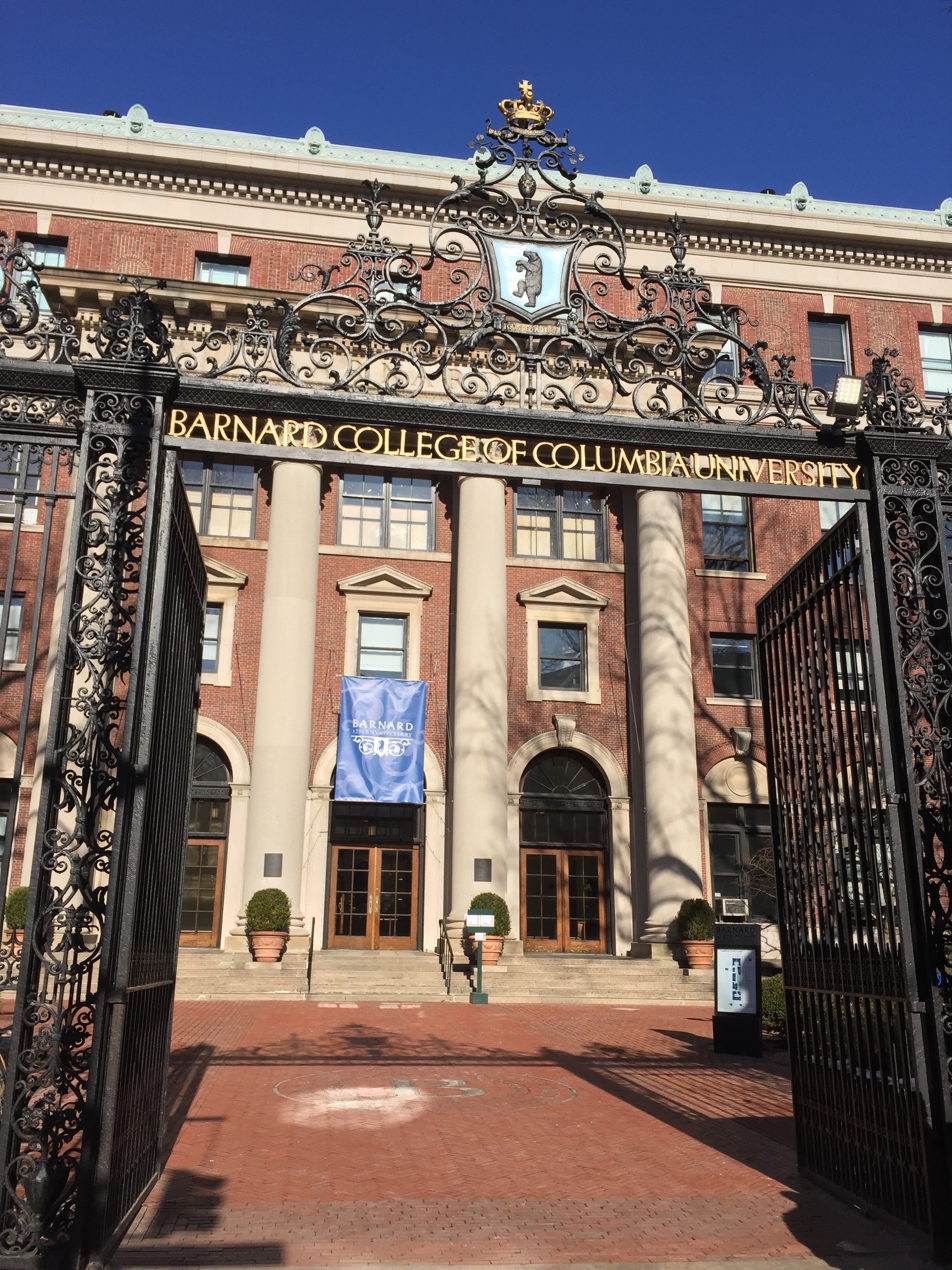
Front gates read "Barnard College of Columbia University."

The Barnard Bulletin in 1976 described the relationship between the college and Columbia University as "intricate and ambiguous." Barnard president Debora Spar said in 2012 that "the relationship is admittedly a complicated one, a unique one and one that may take a few sentences to explain to the outside community." Outside sources often describe Barnard as part of Columbia; The New York Times in 2013, for example, called Barnard "an undergraduate women's college of Columbia University." Its front gates read "Barnard College of Columbia University."

Barnard describes itself as "both an independently incorporated educational institution and an official college of Columbia University" that is "one of the University's four colleges, but we're largely autonomous, with our own leadership and purse strings," and advises students to state "Barnard College, Columbia University" or "Barnard College of Columbia University" on résumés.

Columbia refers to Barnard as one of its schools and an affiliated institution that is a faculty of the university. Both the college and Columbia evaluate Barnard faculty for tenure; in other words, a Barnard tenured professor is a Columbia tenured professor.

Barnard graduates receive Columbia diplomas signed by the Barnard and the Columbia presidents; both diplomas are titled Cvratores Vniversitatis Colvmbiae ('Trustees of Columbia University'). According to the university, the Barnard College degree is held to the same standard as the Columbia College degree. Additionally, both—Barnard College and Columbia College—Columbia University diplomas are written in Latin.

Barnard graduates are also considered members of the Columbia Alumni Association (CAA), and are eligible to receive honors such as the annual Columbia Alumni Medal.

Barnard students wear the same graduation gown as undergraduates from Columbia College, the School of Engineering and Applied Science, and the School of General Studies, and their degrees are conferred during the University Commencement ceremony.

==== Before coeducation at Columbia ====
Smith and Columbia president Seth Low worked to open Columbia classes to Barnard students. By 1900 they could attend Columbia classes in philosophy, political science, and several scientific fields. That year, Barnard formalized an affiliation with the university that made available to its students the instruction and facilities of Columbia. Franz Boas, who taught at both Columbia and Barnard in the early 1900s, was among those faculty members who reportedly found Barnard students superior to their male Columbia counterparts. From 1955, Columbia and Barnard students could register for the other school's classes with the permission of the instructor; from 1973 no permission was needed.

Except for Columbia College, by the 1940s, other undergraduate and graduate divisions of Columbia University admitted women. Columbia president William J. McGill predicted in 1970 that Barnard College and Columbia College would merge within five years. In 1973, Columbia and Barnard signed a three-year agreement to increase sharing classrooms, facilities, and housing, and cooperation in faculty appointments, which they described as "integration without assimilation"; by the mid-1970s, most Columbia dormitories were coed. The university's financial difficulties during the decade increased its desire to merge to end what Columbia described as the "anachronism" of single-sex education, but Barnard resisted doing so because of Columbia's large debt, rejecting in 1975 Columbia dean Peter Pouncey's proposal to merge Barnard and the three Columbia undergraduate schools. The 1973–1976 chairwoman of the board at Barnard, Eleanor Thomas Elliott, led the resistance to the takeover. The college's marketing emphasized the Columbia relationship, however; the Bulletin in 1976 said that Barnard described it as identical to the one between Harvard College and Radcliffe College ("who are merged in practically everything but name at this point").

After Barnard rejected later merger proposals from Columbia and a one-year extension to the 1973 agreement expired, in 1977, the two schools began discussing their future relationship. By 1979, the relationship had so deteriorated that Barnard officials stopped attending meetings. Because of an expected decline in enrollment, in 1980 a Columbia committee recommended that Columbia College begin admitting women without Barnard's cooperation. A 1981 committee found that Columbia was no longer competitive with other Ivy League universities without women, and that admitting women would not affect Barnard's applicant pool. That year Columbia president Michael Sovern agreed for the two schools to cooperate in admitting women to Columbia, but Barnard faculty's opposition caused president Ellen Futter to reject the agreement.

A decade of negotiations for a Columbia-Barnard merger akin to Harvard and Radcliffe had failed. In January 1982, the two schools instead announced that Columbia College would begin admitting women in 1983, and Barnard's control over tenure for its faculty would increase; previously, a committee on which Columbia faculty outnumbered Barnard's three to two controlled the latter's tenure. Applications to Columbia rose 56% that year, making admission more selective, and nine Barnard students transferred to Columbia. Eight students admitted to both Columbia and Barnard chose Barnard, while 78 chose Columbia. Within a few years, however, selectivity rose at both schools as they received more women applicants than expected.

==== After coeducation ====
The Columbia-Barnard affiliation continued. As of 2012, Barnard paid Columbia about $5 million a year under the terms of the "interoperate relationship, " which the two schools renegotiate every 15 years. Despite the affiliation, Barnard is legally and financially separate from Columbia with an independent faculty and board of trustees. It is responsible for its own separate admissions, health, security, guidance and placement services, and has its own alumnae association. Nonetheless, Barnard students participate in the academic, social, athletic and extracurricular life of the broader university community on a reciprocal basis. The affiliation permits the two schools to share some academic resources; for example, only Barnard has an urban studies and dance department and only Columbia has a computer science department. Most Columbia classes are open to Barnard students and vice versa. Barnard students and faculty are represented in the University Senate, and student organizations such as the Columbia Daily Spectator are open to all students. Barnard students play on Columbia athletics teams, including the Ivy League Consortium, and Barnard uses Columbia email, telephone, and network services.

Barnard athletes compete in the Ivy League (NCAA Division I) through the Columbia-Barnard Athletic Consortium, which was established in 1983. Through the arrangement, Barnard is the only women's college offering Division I athletics. There are 15 intercollegiate teams, and students also compete at the intramural and club levels. From 1975 to 1983, before the establishment of the Columbia-Barnard Athletic Consortium, Barnard students competed as the "Barnard Bears." Prior to 1975, students referred to themselves as the "Barnard Honeybears."

== Controversies ==
In the spring of 1960, Columbia University president Grayson Kirk complained to the president of Barnard that Barnard students were wearing inappropriate clothing. The garments in question were pants and Bermuda shorts. The administration forced the student council to institute a dress code. Students would be allowed to wear shorts and pants only at Barnard and only if the shorts were no more than two inches above the knee and the pants were not tight. Barnard women crossing the street to enter the Columbia campus wearing shorts or pants were required to cover themselves with a long coat.

In March 1968, The New York Times ran an article on students who cohabited, identifying one of the persons they interviewed as a student at Barnard College from New Hampshire named "Susan." Barnard officials searched their records for women from New Hampshire and were able to determine that "Susan" was the pseudonym of a student (Linda LeClair) who was living with her boyfriend, a student at Columbia University. She was called before Barnard's student-faculty administration judicial committee, where she faced the possibility of expulsion. A student protest included a petition signed by 300 other Barnard women, admitting that they too had broken the regulations against cohabitating. The judicial committee reached a compromise and the student was allowed to remain in school, but was denied use of the college cafeteria and barred from all social activities. The student briefly became a focus of intense national attention. Barnard president Martha Peterson overruled the committee and expelled LeClair.

In February 2025, Barnard College expelled two students following their disruption of a "History of Modern Israel" class at Columbia University on January 21, 2025. The students interrupted the lecture taught by Professor Avi Shilon, a lecturer with Columbia University's Institute for Israel and Jewish Studies, and distributed materials which condemned the course as "Zionist propaganda." In response to these expulsions, on February 26, 2025, several dozen pro-Palestinian student protesters staged a sit-in at Barnard's Milbank Hall, outside the office of Dean Leslie Grinage. The protesters demanded the reversal of the expulsions, amnesty for students disciplined for pro-Palestinian actions, and a public meeting with college administrators. During the protest, a Barnard employee was physically assaulted and required hospitalization. Barnard's faculty members Nara Milanich, professor of history, and Severin Fowles, professor of anthropology and American studies, served as mediators between the protesters and the administration. The sit-in lasted for over six hours before an agreement was reached to disperse, with a private meeting between the protesters and administrators scheduled for the following day. In July, Barnard College settled its lawsuit Students Against Antisemitism, Inc. et al v. The Trustees of Columbia University in the City of New York et al which accused Barnard of not taking enough measures to combat campus antisemitism.

== Notable people ==
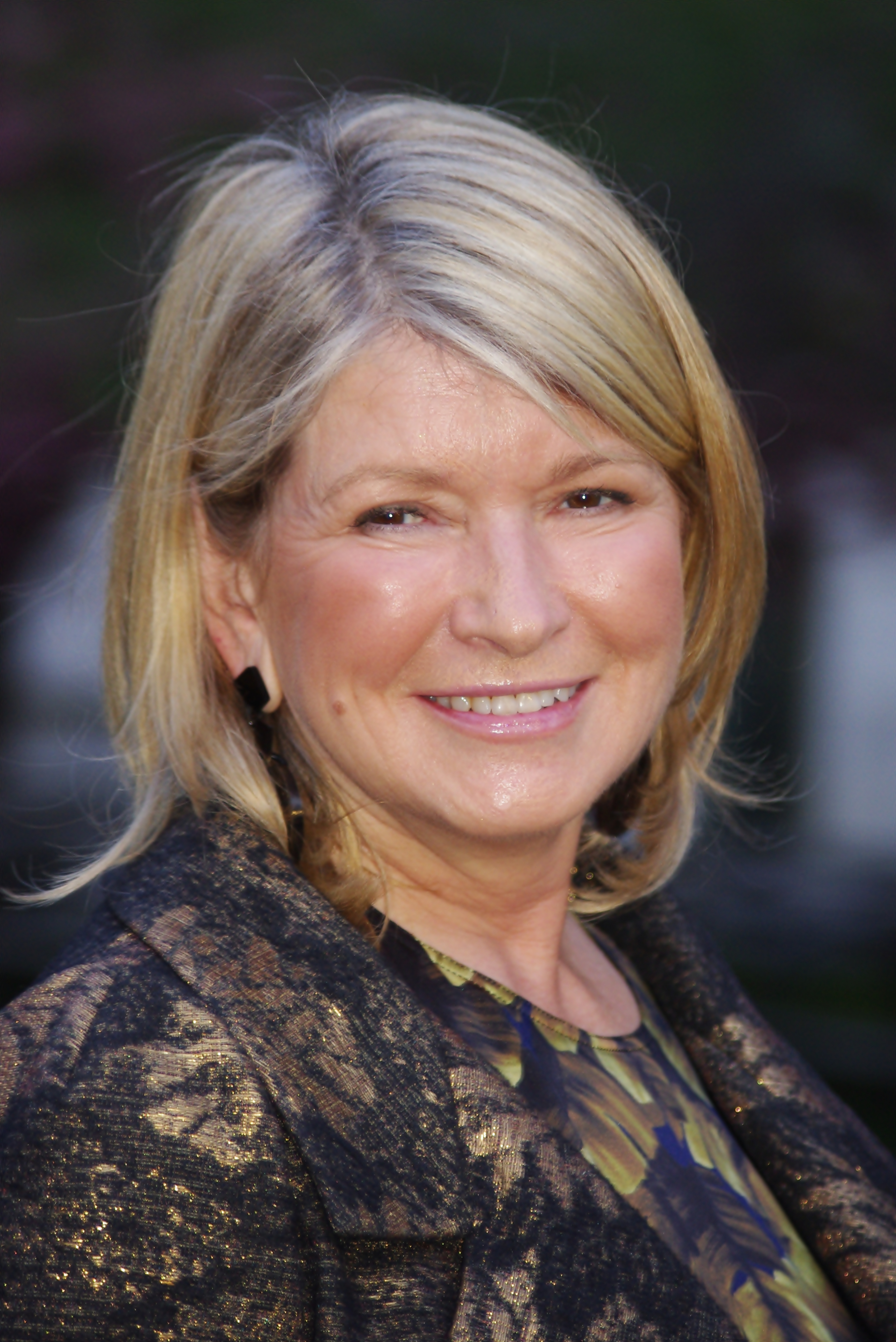
Martha Stewart 1963, businesswoman, author, television personality

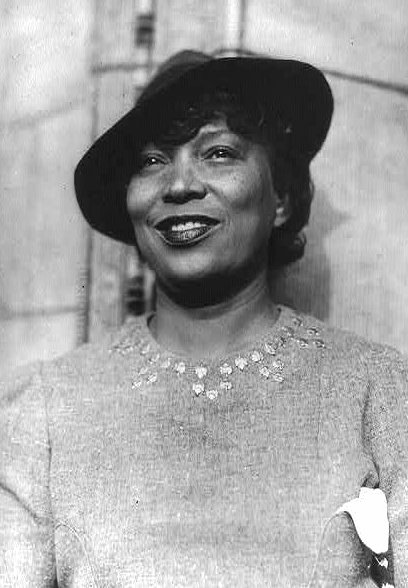
Zora Neale Hurston 1928, writer, anthropologist, and filmmaker

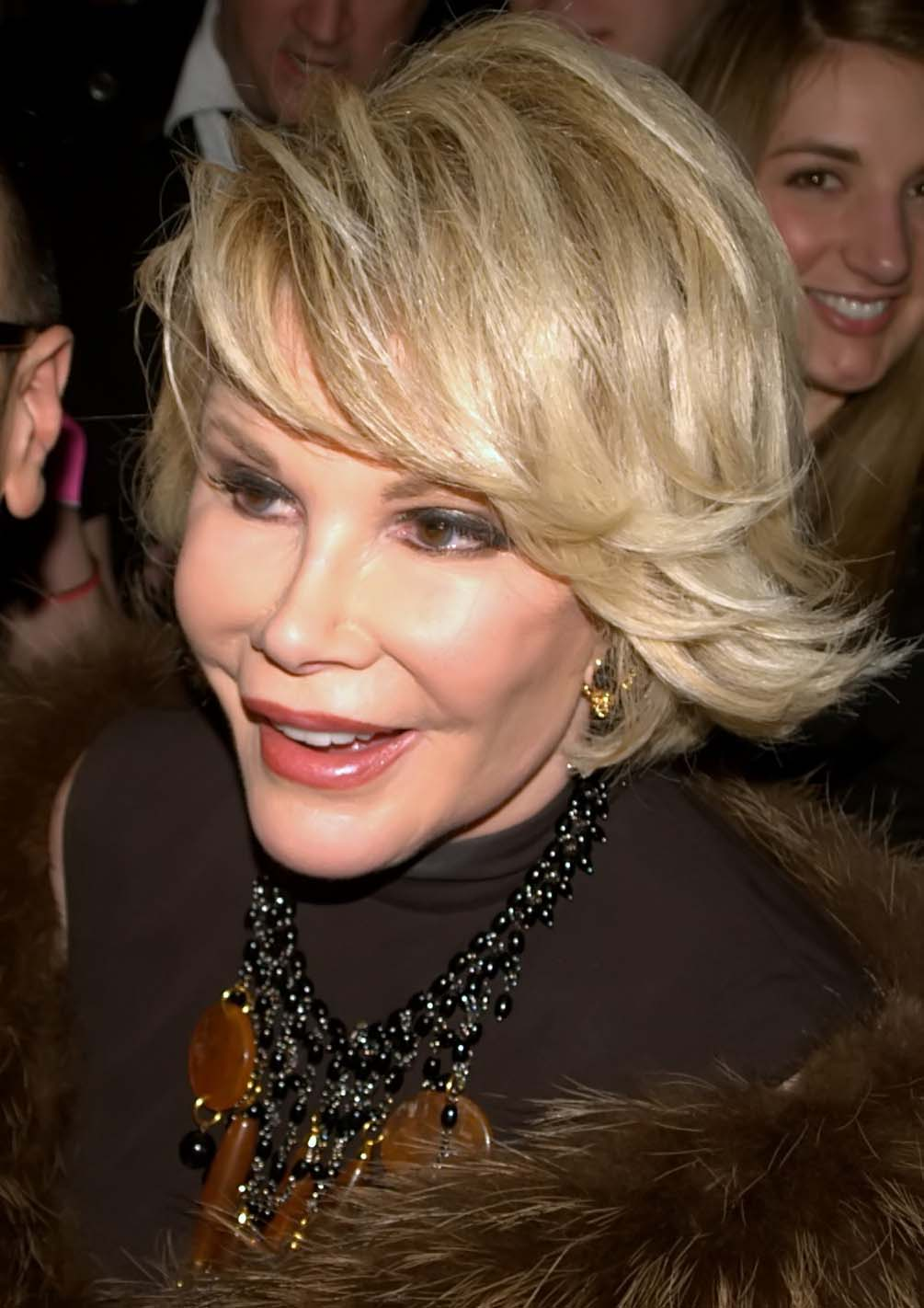
Joan Rivers 1955, comedian, actress

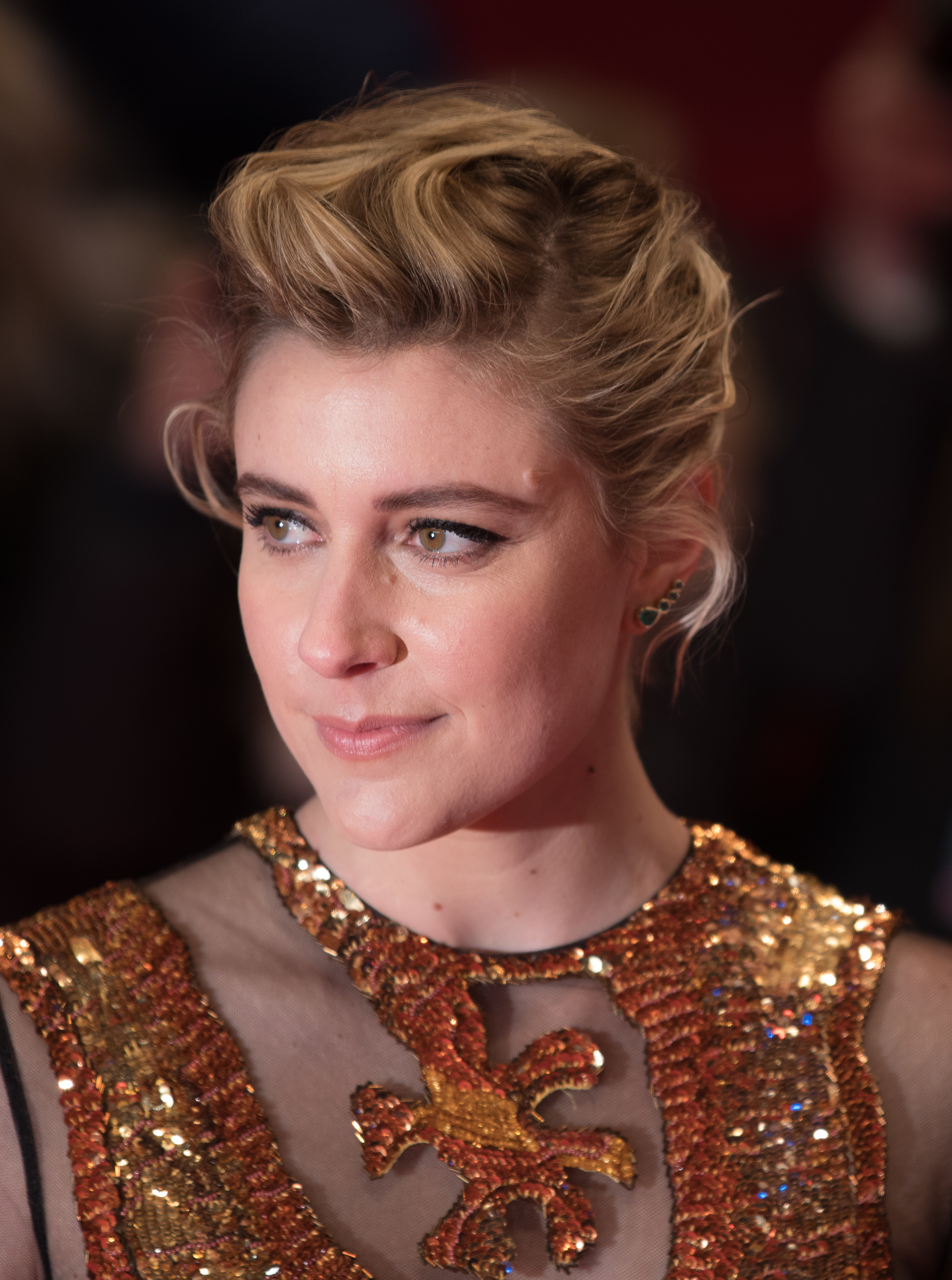
Greta Gerwig 2006, filmmaker

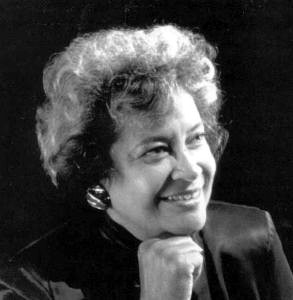
Norma Merrick Sklarek 1950, architect

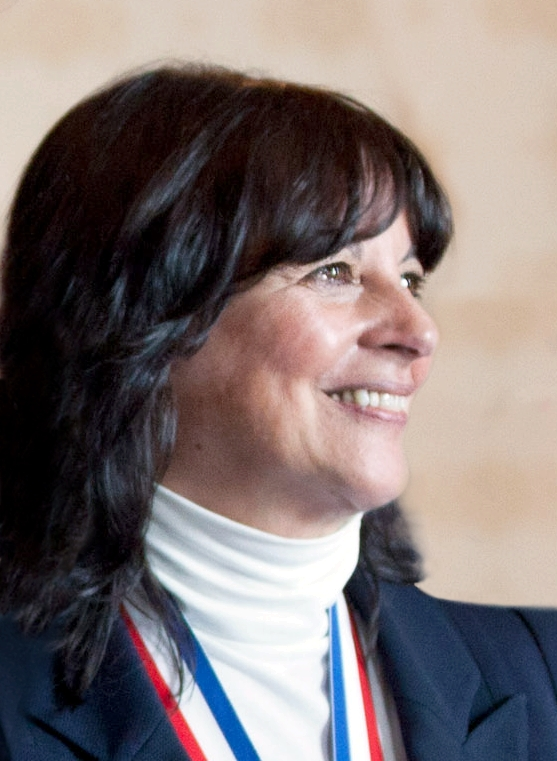
Jacqueline K. Barton 1974, chemist, pioneer in the study of DNA structure

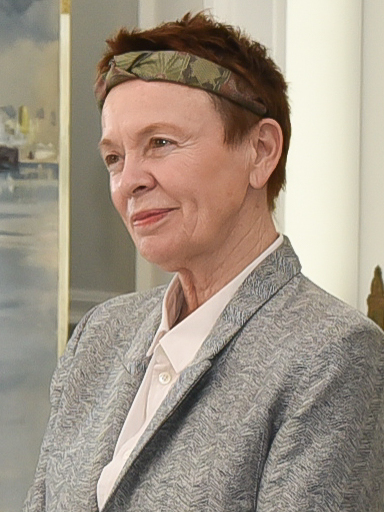
Laurie Anderson 1969, performance artist, NASA's first artist-in-residence

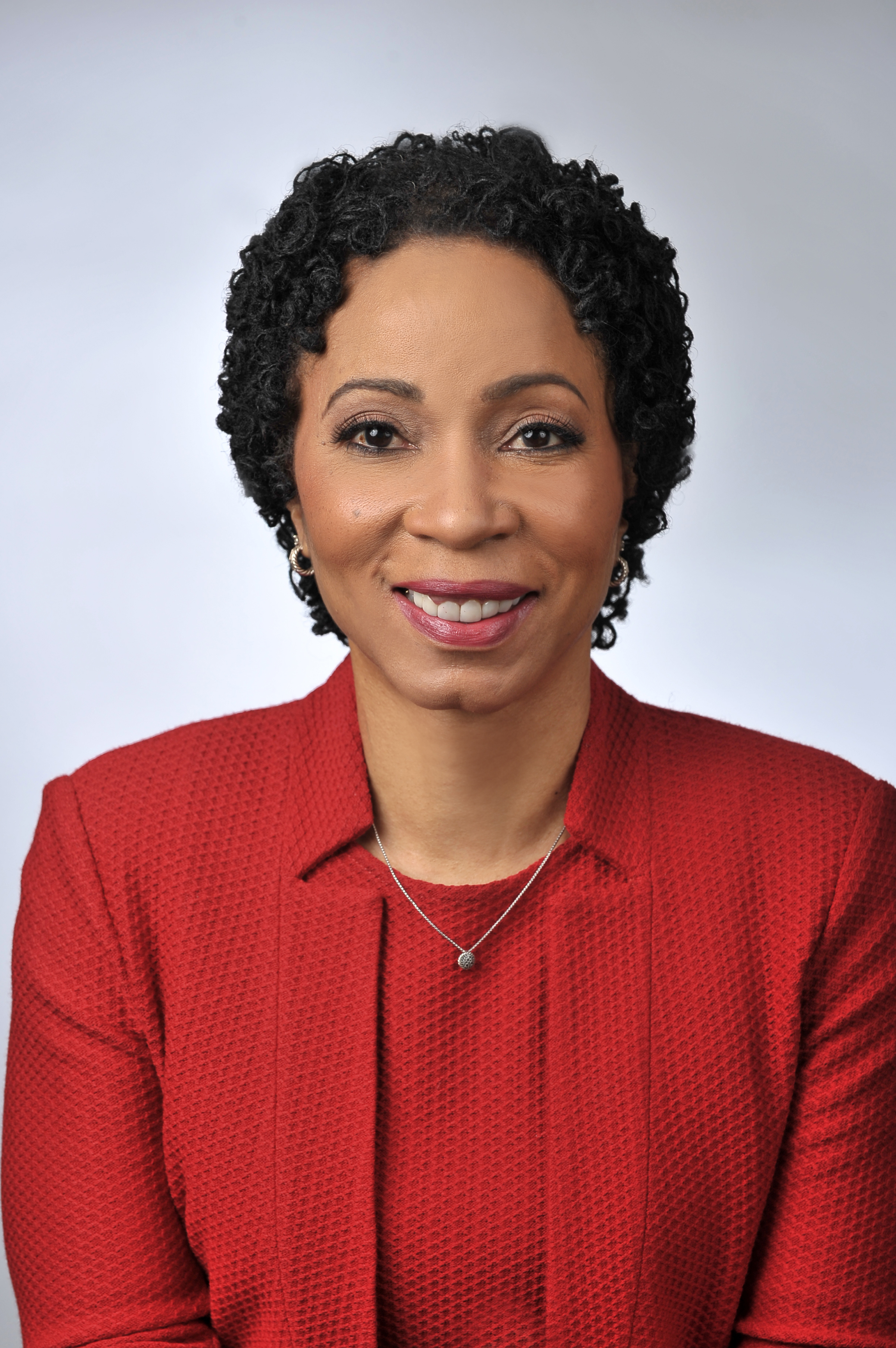
Helene D. Gayle 1976, physician, public health official

Barnard College has graduated many prominent leaders in science, religion, politics, the Peace Corps, medicine, law, education, communications, theater, and business, as well as acclaimed actors, architects, artists, astronauts, engineers, activists, inventors, musicians, philanthropists, and writers.

Graduates that have excelled in academics and writing include academic Louise Holland (1914), author Zora Neale Hurston (1928),, author Erica Jong (1963), author Jhumpa Lahiri (1989), author Patricia Highsmith (1942), and Ann Brashares, author of The Sisterhood of the Traveling Pants (1989).

Many graduates led in government, business, and in various activist causes. These include U.S. Representative Helen Gahagan (1924), Helene D. Gayle, Spelman College's 11th President and former chair of the Presidential Advisory Council on HIV/AIDS (1970), Susan N. Herman, president of the American Civil Liberties Union (1968), Judith Kaye, Chief Judge of the New York Court of Appeals (1958), Phyllis E. Grann, CEO of Penguin Putnam, Wilma B. Liebman, chair of the National Labor Relations Board (1971),, and Cynthia Nixon, actress, activist, and gubernatorial candidate (1988).

Other graduates made significant achievements in the arts and sciences. These include biologist Leona Zacharias, television host Ronnie Eldridge (1952), Laurie Anderson, musician and performance artist (1969), Amy Hwang, The New Yorker cartoonist (2000), Kelly McCreary, actress from Grey's Anatomy (2003), Greta Gerwig, writer and director (2004), and Christy Carlson Romano, actress (2015).

== See also ==
- Athena Film Festival
- Barnard Center for Research on Women
- Hidden Ivies: Thirty Colleges of Excellence
- Women's colleges in the United States
- List of coordinate colleges
