= Laura Drake Gill =

Barnard College dean

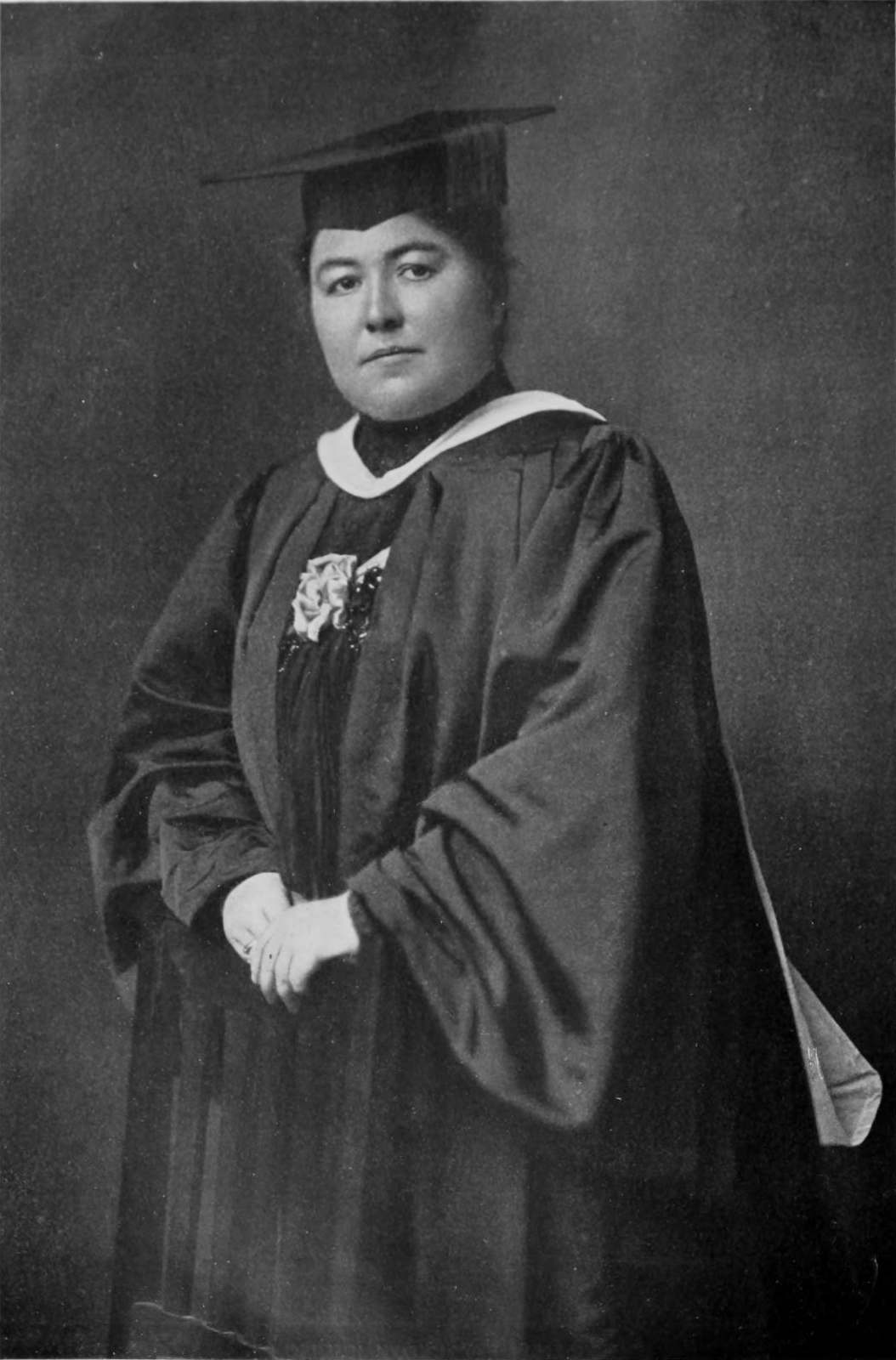
- Born: August 24, 1860; Chesterville, Maine, U.S.
- Died: February 3, 1926 (aged 65); Berea, Kentucky, U.S.
- Occupations: Educator, college administrator
- Known for: Third dean of Barnard College (1901-1907)

Laura Drake Gill (August 24, 1860 – February 3, 1926) was an American educator. She was the third dean of Barnard College, serving in that role from 1901 to 1907, and president of the Association of Collegiate Alumnae.

== Early life and education ==
Gill was born in Chesterville, Maine, the daughter of Elisha Gill and Huldah H. Capen Gill. Her father died in 1873. She graduated in 1881 from Smith College with a degree in mathematics. She continued at Smith to earn a master's degree in 1885. She later earned a law degree from the Sewanee College.

== Career ==
Gill taught mathematics at Miss Capen's School in Massachusetts, from 1881 to 1898. In 1898, she went to Cuba among the first group of nurses sent by the Red Cross, and she headed the Cuban Orphan Society.

Gill succeeded Emily James Smith to become the third dean of Barnard College, a position she held from 1901 to 1907. She was succeeded by Virginia Gildersleeve in 1911.

After Barnard, Gill became national president of the Association of Collegiate Alumnae, and organized the Vocational Bureau for College Women in America. She was education chair of the General Federation of Women's Clubs. She worked for Sewanee College beginning in 1911, to develop plans for a Women's College of the South. She was an administrator at Berea College In Kentucky in her last years.

== Publications ==
- "Kindergarten and Industrial Training in Cuba" (1901)
- "Service of Organized Women to the Public School" (1909)
- "The Woman in Higher Education" (1914)

== Personal life ==
Gill died in 1926, in Berea, Kentucky, at the age of 65. Columbia University owns a portrait of Gill, painted by Julia Redding Kelly.
