= Brooks and Hewitt Halls =

- U.S. National Register of Historic Places
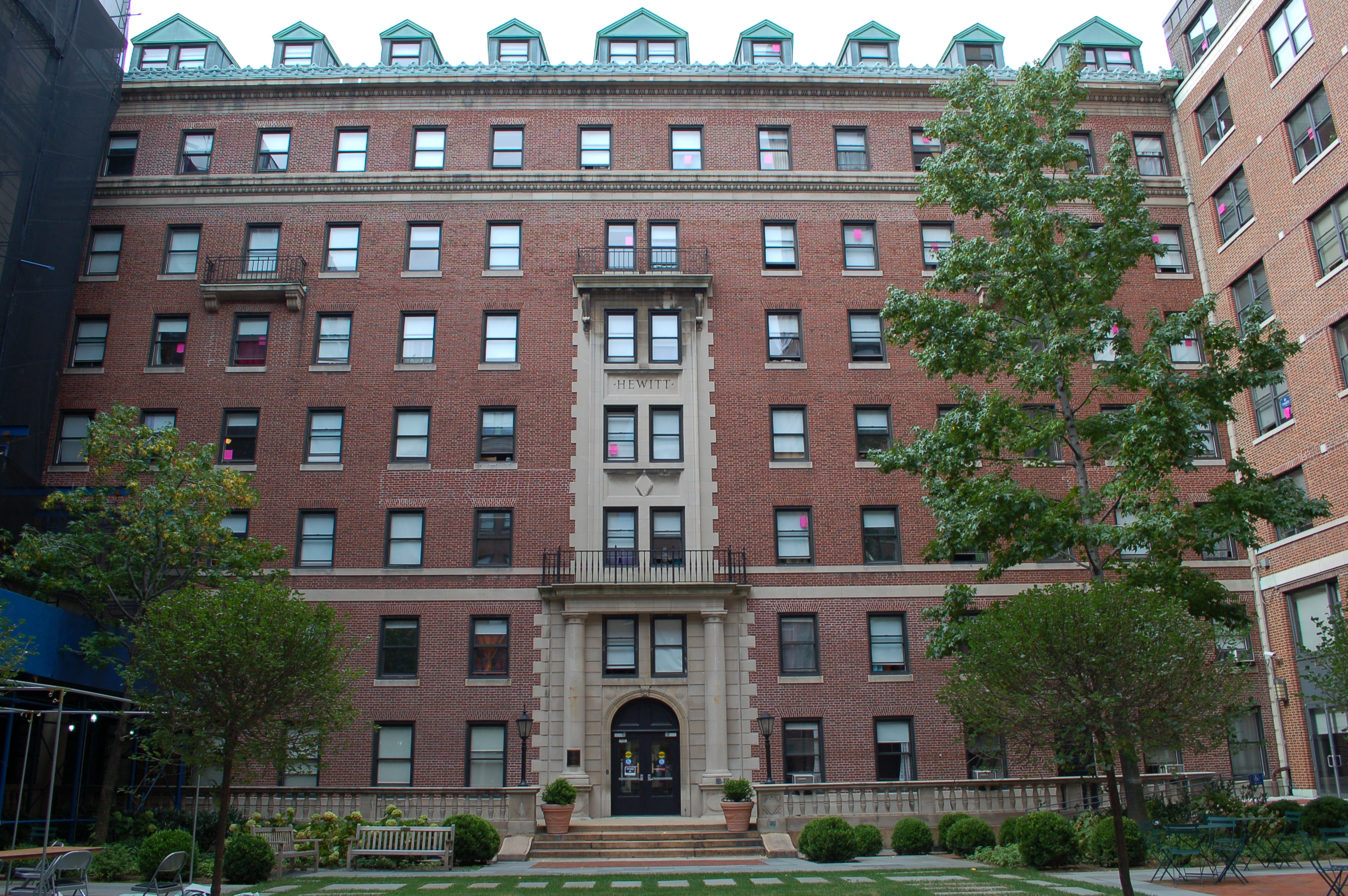
- Hewitt Hall, October 2009

- Location within New York City Location within New York Location within the United States
- Location: Jct. W. 116th St. and Claremont Ave., New York, New York
- Coordinates: 40°48′30″N 73°57′54″W
- Area: less than one acre
- Built: 1906
- Architect: Rich, Charles; McKim, Mead & White
- Architectural style: Renaissance, Colonial Revival
- NRHP reference No.: 03001151
- Added to NRHP: November 15, 2003

Brooks and Hewitt Halls are historic dormitory buildings located on the campus of Barnard College in Morningside Heights, Manhattan, New York City. Brooks Hall was designed by Charles A. Rich (1854–1943) and built in 1906–1907. It is a seven and one half story, red Harvard brick building on a granite foundation with limestone and terra cotta trim. It features a sloping Spanish tile roof with hip-roof dormer windows. Hewitt Hall, named for Abram S. Hewitt, was designed by McKim, Mead & White and built in 1926–1927. It is a seven-story, red Harvard brick building with a sloping copper clad roof.

They were listed on the National Register of Historic Places in 2003.

== See also ==
- National Register of Historic Places listings in Manhattan above 110th Street
- Barnard Hall
- Milbank, Brinckerhoff, and Fiske Halls
