= Debora Spar =

American professor and administrator

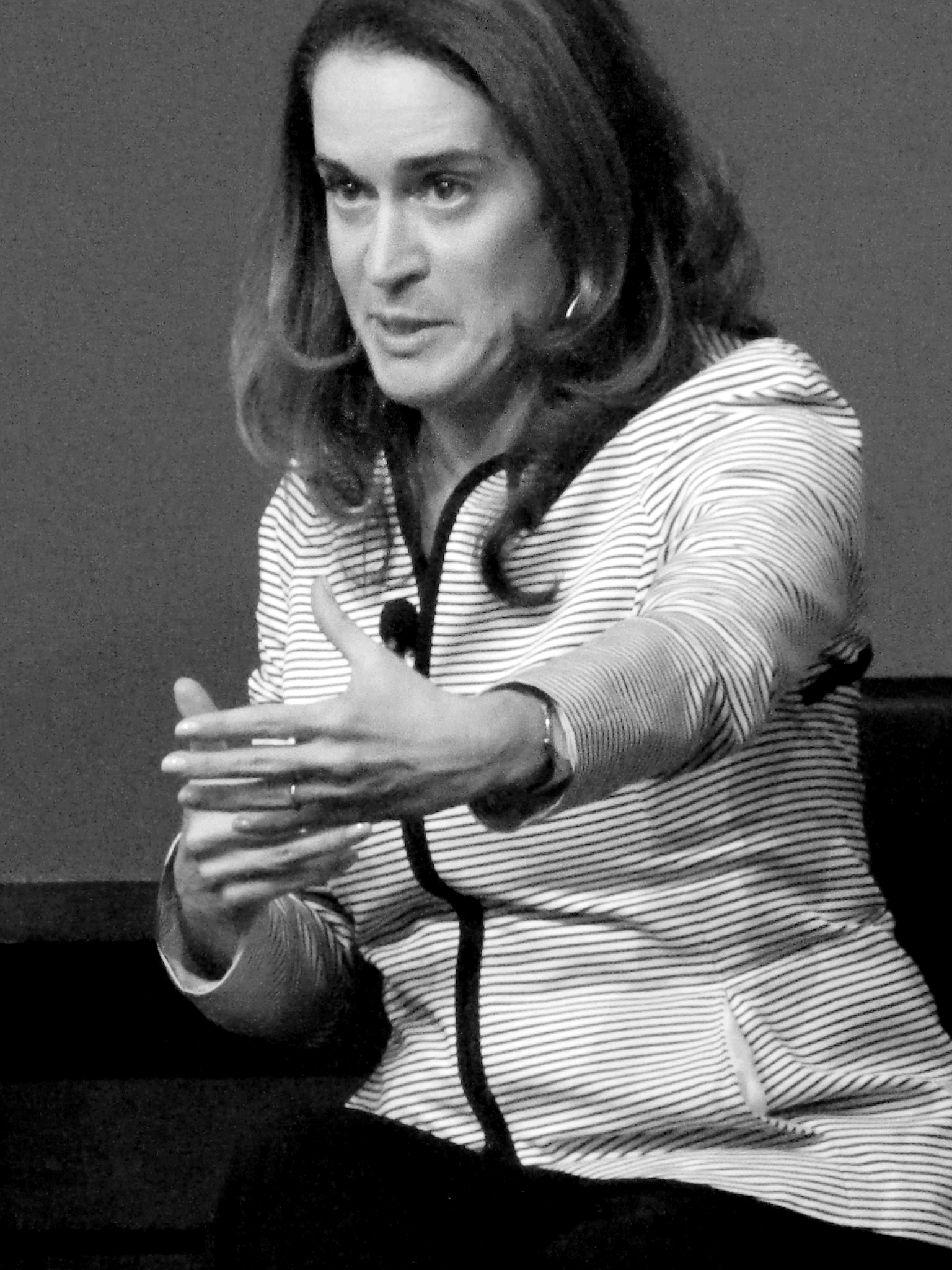
- Spar in 2013

President of the Lincoln Center for Performing Arts
- In office March 2017 – April 2018
- Preceded by: Jed Bernstein
- Succeeded by: Henry Timms

7th President of Barnard College
- In office July 1, 2008 – March 5, 2017
- Preceded by: Judith Shapiro
- Succeeded by: Sian Beilock

Personal details
- Spouse: Miltos Catomeris (m. 1987)
- Children: 3
- Education: Georgetown University (BA); Harvard University (PhD)
- Website: https://www.deboraspar.com/

Debora Lynn Spar is a professor and higher education administrator at Harvard Business School, and the former President of Barnard College and the Lincoln Center for the Performing Arts. She became the new Senior Associate Dean of Harvard Business School Online in January 2020.

== Early life and education ==
Spar graduated magna cum laude in 1984 from the Edmund A. Walsh School of Foreign Service at Georgetown University and completed her Ph.D. at Harvard University in government.

== Career ==
After obtaining her PhD, Spar became a professor at Harvard in 1991, where she spent 17 years at Harvard Business School, eventually becoming a senior associate dean and chair of Harvard's Committee on Human Rights.

=== President of Barnard ===
Spar was announced as the 7th president of Barnard College on January 30, 2008, succeeding Judith Shapiro who had served in the position for 14 years. In her inaugural address on October 23, 2008, Spar stated that as president, she would aim to make Barnard a more internationally recognized institution for women, as well as expand and improve the current Barnard Leadership Initiative (BLI). She followed up on this goal by converting BLI into Barnard's Athena Center for Leadership Studies. As President of Barnard, she was also an academic dean within Columbia University.

=== President of the Lincoln Center for the Performing Arts ===
In November 2016, the Lincoln Center for the Performing Arts announced that Spar would succeed Jed Bernstein as the center's president. However, after just over a year as president, Spar announced her resignation on April 6, 2018. She was succeeded by Henry Timms.

=== Return to Harvard ===
Spar eventually returned to Harvard, where she became the senior associate dean of Harvard Business School Online and a professor business administration at Harvard Business School.

== Research and academic interests ==
Spar has written about the economics of the human fertility industry and the evolution of the Internet. Her work on the economics of fertility drew wide attention.

She has appeared on 60 Minutes, The News Hour with Jim Lehrer, ABC World News Tonight, and in many newspapers and magazines. Her own articles have appeared in publications ranging from The New England Journal of Medicine to Foreign Affairs to The Review of International Political Economy.

In 2001, she wrote an article called "Why the Internet Doesn't Change Everything" which described the distinctive nature of the internet industry. Her book, The Baby Business: How Money, Science and Politics Drive the Commerce of Conception, pioneered research about the economy of alternative fertility. Spar was the first academic to mention fertility as a transaction through a business framework. In various interviews online, Spar said that when she picked up the research topic of fertility through an economic lens, her colleagues did not take her seriously and called her soft. She followed up in 2006 with a book named The Hidden Market for Babies. Spar has also written about AIDS, African economics, the global economy, the balance of power, and terrorism.

A leading figure in business academics, Spar also ran Making Markets Work, joint program between Harvard Business School and the University of Pretoria Gordon Institute of Business Science. The course in South Africa teaches about the interconnection of the public and private sectors' effects on economic growth. Spar also spearheaded the initiative in Rwanda, where cabinet members learned about executive education.

== Personal life ==
Spar married Miltos Catomeris in 1987. They have three children.

Spar also served as a member of the Board of Directors of American investment bank Goldman Sachs from June 2011 to April 2017.

== Works ==
- The Baby Business, Harvard Business School Press, 2006
- Ruling the Waves: Cycles of Discovery, Chaos, and Wealth from the Compass to the Internet
- The Cooperative Edge: The Internal Politics of International Cartels
- Beyond Globalism: Remaking American Foreign Economic Policy
- Wonder Women: Sex, Power, and the Quest for Perfection, 2013
- Work Mate Marry Love: How Machines Shape Our Human Destiny, 2020
