= Laura Rosenbury =

University President

9th president of Barnard College
- Incumbent
- Assumed office July 1, 2023
- Preceded by: Sian Beilock

Dean of the University of Florida Levin College of Law
- In office July 1, 2015 – July 1, 2023
- Preceded by: Robert Jerry
- Succeeded by: Merritt McAlister

Personal details
- Born: 1969 or 1970 (age 56–57) South Bend, Indiana, U.S.
- Education: Radcliffe College (BA); Harvard University (JD)

Laura Ann Rosenbury (born 1969/1970) is an American legal scholar who is the ninth president of Barnard College. Prior to serving at Barnard, Rosenbury was the dean of the University of Florida Levin College of Law.

Rosenbury served as president of Barnard College during the 2024 Columbia University pro-Palestinian campus occupation and oversaw the suspension and evictions of at least 55 Barnard students.

== Education and career ==
Rosenbury grew up in Elkhart, Indiana, before moving to Rye, New York. Rosenbury graduated from Radcliffe College with a B.A. in women's studies in 1992 and earned her J.D. from Harvard Law School in 1997, where she was an editor of the Harvard Law Review. She then moved to New York and clerked for Judge Carol Amon of the U.S. District Court for the Eastern District of New York and Judge Dennis Jacobs of the U.S. Court of Appeals for the Second Circuit.

Rosenbury taught at Fordham Law before moving in 2002 to Washington University School of Law. Rosenbury was the vice dean at the School of Law from 2010 to 2012 and served as a visiting professor at Harvard Law School, Stanford Law School, and the University of Chicago Law School.

=== UF Levin College of Law ===
In 2015, Rosenbury was appointed as the first full-time woman dean of the UF Levin College of Law. Rosenbury was elected to the American Law Institute in 2010 and was named a fellow of the American Bar Foundation in 2014.

During her tenure as dean, Rosenbury played a role in efforts by Florida governor Ron DeSantis to block professors at the university from testifying in or joining onto amicus briefs in cases against the state; these efforts were struck down by a federal judge. In addition, faculty criticized her tenure as dean, with more than half "claiming that the school [was] not a fair work environment."

=== Barnard College ===
Rosenbury began her tenure as president of Barnard College on June 12, 2023, and was officially inaugurated at a ceremony on February 2, 2024, at Riverside Church. The event drew protesters following calls by pro-Palestinian student groups for a boycott of the ceremony.

A week and a half after the start of the 2024 Columbia University pro-Palestinian campus occupation, and the suspensions of at least 55 Barnard students, the Barnard College chapter of the American Association of University Professors unanimously issued a vote of "no confidence" in Rosenbury, by a vote of 102 to 0. One week later, on April 30, 2024, over 77 percent of the entire Barnard faculty issued a vote of "no confidence" in Rosenbury, in a vote 228 for and 56 against, and a number of students marked the occasion with a "Vote of No Confidence Picnic". It was the first time in the college's history that a president had been given a vote of no confidence.
