= Ella Weed =

American educator

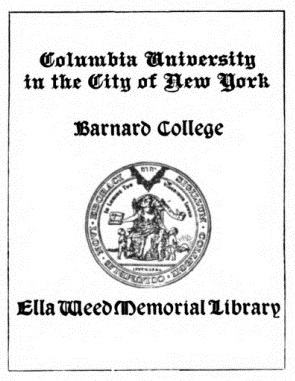
- Bookplate of the Ella Weed Memorial Library at Barnard College
- Born: January 27, 1853; Newburgh, New York, United States
- Died: January 10, 1894 (aged 40); New York, New York, United States
- Education: Vassar College
- Known for: Founding Trustee of Barnard College

Ella Weed (27 January 1853 – 10 January 1894) was an American educator, "the guiding spirit in the first four years" of Barnard College.

== Life ==
After graduating from Vassar College, Ella Weed became principal of Miss Brown's School for Girls in New York. Annie Nathan Meyer interested her in the effort to establish Barnard College. Weed attracted financial support for the venture, and became the paid chairman of the Academic Committee.

== Works ==
- A Foolish Virgin: a novel, 1883. A satirical novel about a Vassar graduate who tries to hide her intelligence and education.
- Pearls Strung by Ella Weed, 1898. A posthumously-published anthology of selections from Weed's favorite authors.
