= Milbank, Brinckerhoff, and Fiske Halls =

Buildings in Manhattan, New York

- U.S. National Register of Historic Places
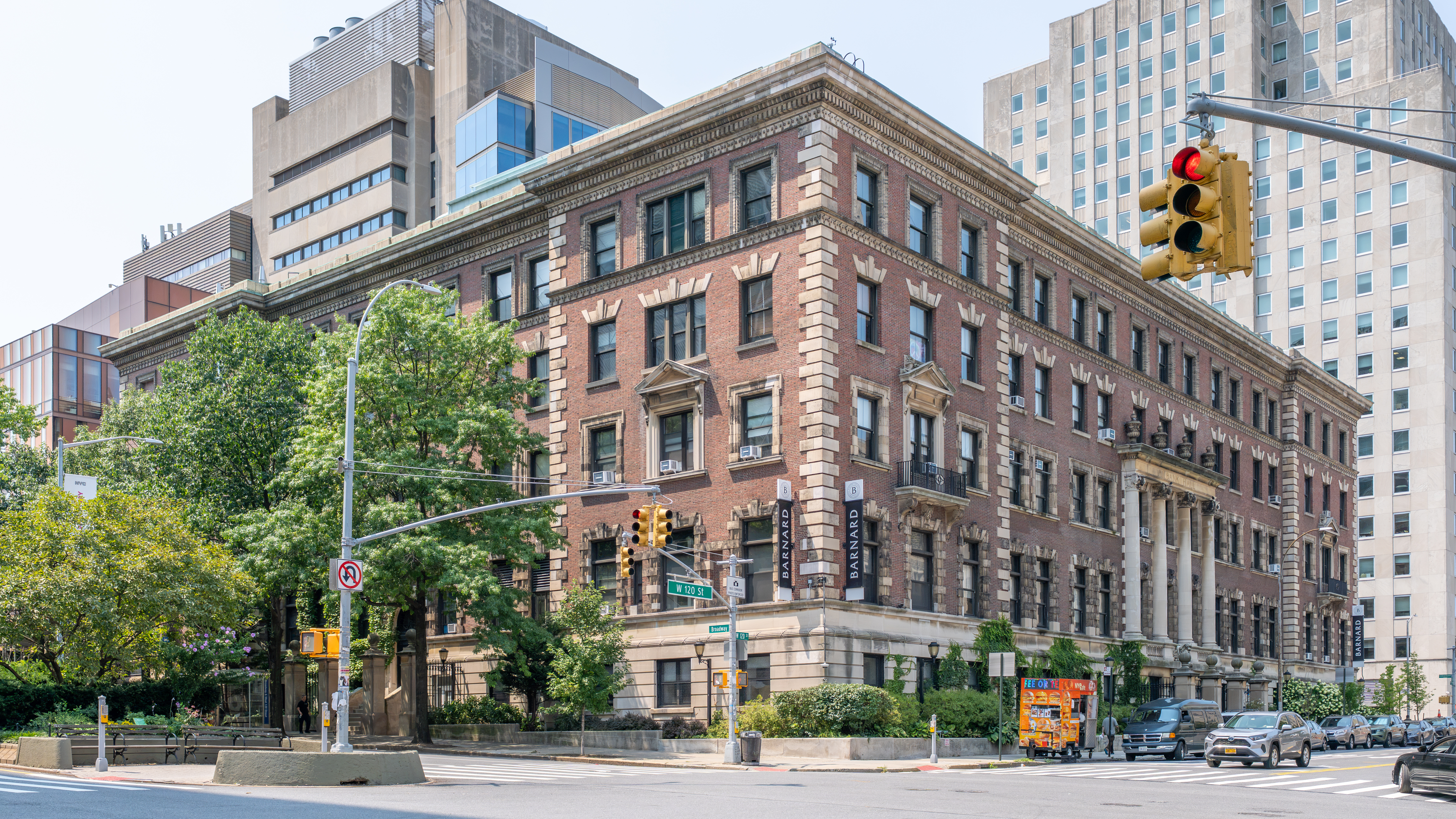
- (2026)

- Location within New York City Location within New York Location within the United States
- Location: Roughly bounded by W. 119th and W. 120th Sts., and Broadway and Claremont Aves., New York, New York
- Coordinates: 40°48′38″N 73°57′46″W
- Area: 1 acre (0.40 ha)
- Built: 1897
- Architect: Rich, Charles A.; Lamb and Rich
- Architectural style: Romanesque, Colonial Revival
- NRHP reference No.: 03001152
- Added to NRHP: November 15, 2003

Milbank, Brinckerhoff, and Fiske Halls are historic buildings located on the campus of Barnard College in Morningside Heights, Manhattan, New York City. The three interconnected buildings are collectively known as Milbank Hall. They were designed by Charles A. Rich (1854–1943), built between 1897 and 1898, and contain classrooms, laboratories, administrative offices and dormitory. They are four stories on a raised basement built of dark red brick with white limestone and terra cotta details. They combine Italian Renaissance massing and detail with Colonial Revival inspired features. The roof of Milbank Hall houses the Arthur Ross Greenhouse.

They were listed on the National Register of Historic Places in 2003.

== See also ==
- National Register of Historic Places listings in Manhattan above 110th Street
- Barnard Hall
- Brooks and Hewitt Halls
