= Judith Shapiro =

American anthropologist

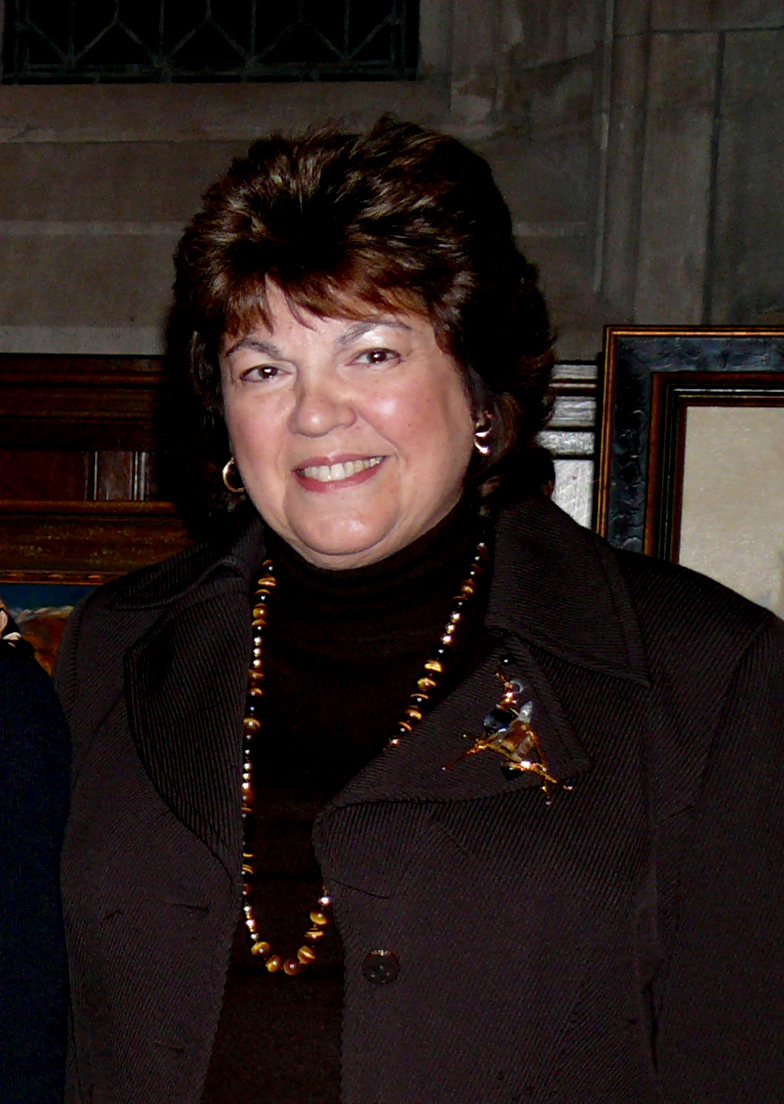
- Shapiro in 2010

6th President of Barnard College
- In office 1994 – July 1, 2008
- Preceded by: Ellen Futter
- Succeeded by: Debora Spar

Personal details
- Born: January 24, 1942 (age 84)
- Education: Brandeis University (BA); Columbia University (PhD)

Judith R. Shapiro (born January 24, 1942) is a former President of Barnard College, a liberal arts college for women at Columbia University. Prior to her role at Barnard, she had a teaching career as a cultural anthropologist at Bryn Mawr College and The University of Chicago. She served as president of the Teagle Foundation from 2013 to 2018.

== Early life and education ==
A native of New York City, Shapiro was the first Barnard president educated in the New York public schools. Her mother taught Latin and was a librarian in the school system. Judith Shapiro graduated magna cum laude from Brandeis University in Massachusetts with majors in history and French.

Shapiro first entered the graduate program in history at the University of California, Berkeley in 1963 but soon dropped out, disillusioned by the prospect of a career as a professional historian. Having never taken a course in anthropology, she discovered the writing of French anthropologist Claude Lévi-Strauss and decided to change fields, applying for a scholarship to do graduate work in anthropology at Columbia University.

Soon, as part of her studies, she began doing “salvage ethnography” fieldwork (a movement of the 1960s aimed at documenting and recording what were believed to be dying indigenous cultures) among the Northern Paiute of the Great Basin region of the United States in eastern California, western Nevada, and southeast Oregon. A few years later, Shapiro carried out a series of fieldwork studies among indigenous groups in Brazil, studying missionization among the Tapirapé and the lives of Yanomami women in the Catrimani area (the villages of Wkata?ut'eri and Surucucu).

She received her Ph.D. in anthropology from Columbia University in New York following the defense of her dissertation, Sex Roles and Social Structure Among the Yanomama Indians of Northern Brazil. Judith Shapiro has also published several scholarly articles on gender differentiation, social theory, and missionization based on her field research.

In particular, the perspectives she gained while living among the Yanomami women provided a critical counterpoint to the cultural descriptions and theoretical perspectives about the Brazilian tribe that had been championed by the dominant (and controversial) anthropologist of that cultural group, Napoleon Chagnon.

== Career ==
Shapiro began her teaching career at the University of Chicago in 1970, the first woman appointed to the Department of Anthropology, and moved to Bryn Mawr in 1975.

On the Bryn Mawr College faculty, she was named as chair of the Department of Anthropology. After serving as Acting Dean of the Undergraduate College in 1985–6, she was appointed as Provost, the chief academic officer, a position she held from 1986 until 1994.

Shapiro became Barnard College's sixth president in 1994. As President of Barnard, she was also an academic dean within the university as well as a professor of anthropology at Barnard. Upon Shapiro's retirement, Debora L. Spar was appointed to replace Shapiro as Barnard's president effective July 1, 2008.

Shapiro was President of the American Ethnological Society, a Fellow at the Center for Advanced Study in the Behavioral Sciences, and a Fellow of the American Council of Learned Societies. In December 2002, she received the National Institute of Social Sciences’ Gold Medal Award for her contributions as a leader in higher education for women. She was elected in 2003 to membership in the prestigious American Philosophical Society, joining 728 distinguished members nationally in the oldest learned society in the United States.

In 2013, she began her five-year role as president of the Teagle Foundation in New York City, which works to support and strengthen liberal arts education and serve as a catalyst for the improvement of teaching and learning.
