= Charles A. Rich =

American architect

Charles Alonzo Rich
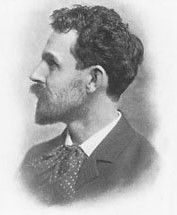
- Born: October 22, 1854; Beverly, Massachusetts
- Died: December 3, 1943 (aged 89); Charlottesville, Virginia
- Education: Dartmouth College
- Occupation: Architect
- Practice: Partner in Lamb & Rich
- Buildings: Barnard College Milbank, Brinckerhoff, and Fiske Halls (1897-1898) and Brooks Hall (1906-1907)
- Projects: Barnard College master plan (1906, unrealized)

Charles Alonzo Rich (October 22, 1854 – December 3, 1943) was an American architect who practiced in New York City from 1882 until 1933. Rich was a member of the Architectural League of New York. Rich was a partner in the New York architectural firm of Lamb & Rich, which mostly specialized in residential design.

== Life ==
Rich was born on October 22, 1854, in Beverly, Massachusetts. His father was Alonzo B. Rich, a pastor. Rich's family moved to Lebanon, New Hampshire in 1871 when his father was appointed to the town's West Congregational Church. Rich then enrolled at nearby Dartmouth College that same year. Rather than attending the school's Academic Department, Rich attended the Chandler Scientific Department, which was a separate branch of the College established in 1852 to provide programs in architecture and civil engineering, among other subjects. While a student at Dartmouth, Rich was the historian of his class and joined the chess club during his first year. He was a member of the Vitruvian Society, a fraternity specific to the Chandler School that later became the Dartmouth chapter of Beta Theta Pi. He also played for the school's baseball teams, having been captain of the Chandler School's team and first baseman for the university team, which drew players from both the Chandler School and Academic Department. Rich graduated from the College in 1875.

After graduating, Rich moved to Boston to work under William Ralph Emerson, who was a key contributor to Shingle style architecture. Under Emerson, Rich had his first design, a pinewood cottage in West Lebanon, published in The American Architect and Building News in 1878. Rich left Emerson's office in 1879 to travel abroad in order to study Old World architecture. The sites he visited included Egyptian temples and French castles. During this period, he reported receiving a commission from the Russian Empire, though it is not known whether a work was produced as a result.

He died at his home in Charlottesville, Virginia, at the age of 89.

== Notable buildings ==
- Claremont Opera House (1897); Claremont, NH, a fine example of Renaissance Revival architecture listed on the National Register of Historic Places in 1973.
- Milbank, Brinckerhoff, and Fiske Halls (1897-1898), Barnard College; listed on the National Register of Historic Places in 2003.
- Phi Delta Alpha (1902); the first purpose-built fraternity in New Hampshire, and the first fraternity on Dartmouth's "frat row" (Webster Avenue).
- Webster Hall (1907); originally the primary auditorium of Dartmouth College, now converted to a special collections library.
- Allbritton Center, formerly known as John Bell Scott Memorial Laboratory (1904); a historic building off of Wesleyan University's brownstone row.
- Brooks Hall (1906-1907), Barnard College; listed on the National Register of Historic Places in 2003.
- Copshaholm, the Joseph Doty Oliver mansion in South Bend, Indiana (1895-1896); listed on the National Register of Historic Places and listed as an American Treasure
