= Barnard Hall =

- Students' Hall
- U.S. National Register of Historic Places
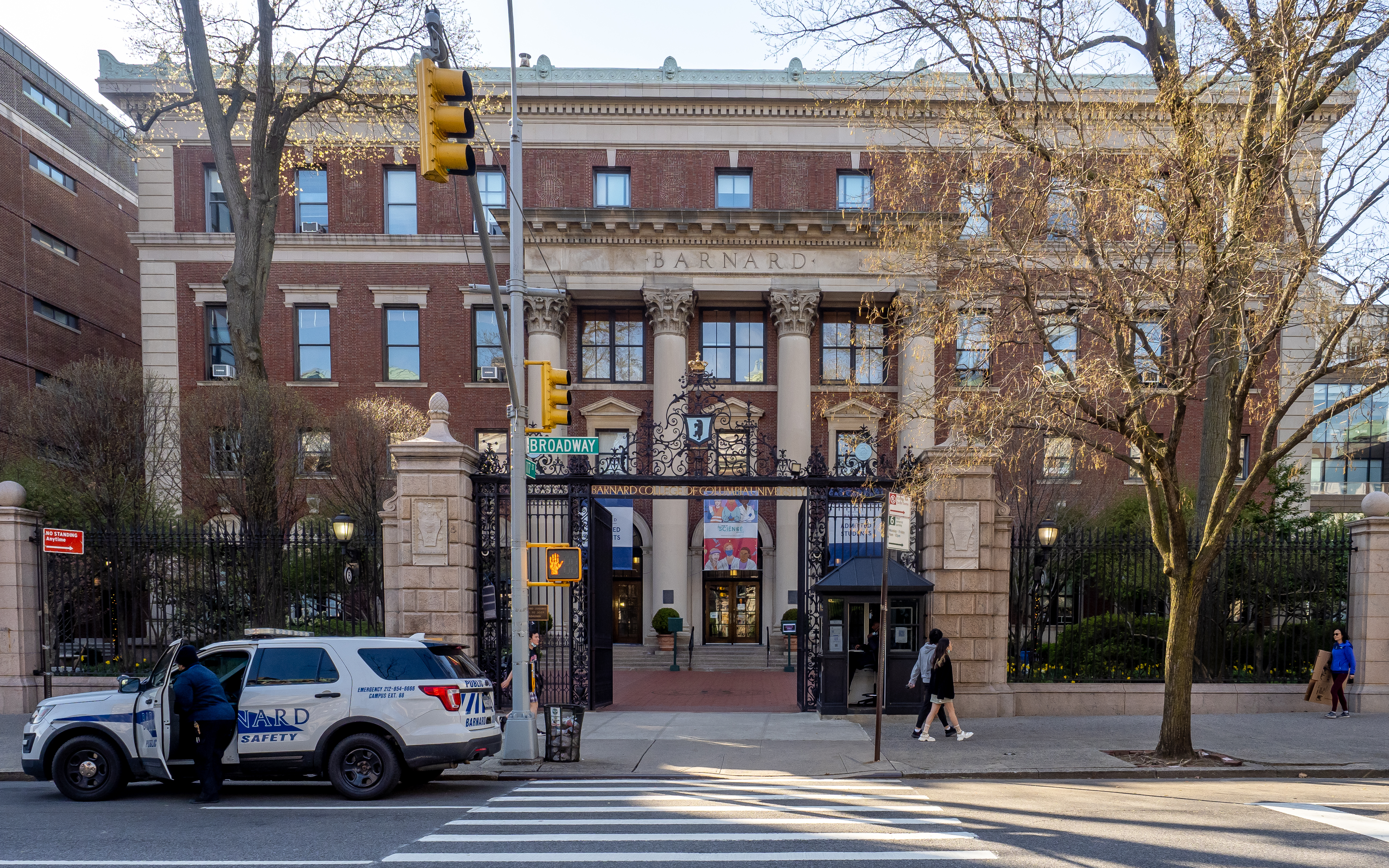
- Barnard Hall, April 2022

- Location within New York City Location within New York Location within the United States
- Location: Barnard College, 3005 Broadway, New York, New York
- Coordinates: 40°48′32″N 73°57′52″W
- Area: 1 acre (0.40 ha)
- Built: 1916
- Architect: Arnold W. Brunner; Buchman & Fox
- Architectural style: Renaissance, Colonial Revival
- NRHP reference No.: 03001150
- Added to NRHP: November 15, 2003

Barnard Hall, originally known as Student's Hall, is a historic educational building located on the campus of Barnard College in Morningside Heights, New York, New York. It was designed by Arnold W. Brunner and Buchman & Fox in 1916, and contains classrooms. It is four stories on a raised basement built of dark red brick with white limestone and terra cotta details. It combines Italian Renaissance massing and detail with Colonial Revival inspired features. The front facade features a three-story limestone portico with four monumental Corinthian order columns.

The hall was listed on the National Register of Historic Places in 2003.

== See also ==
- National Register of Historic Places listings in Manhattan above 110th Street
- Brooks and Hewitt Halls
- Milbank, Brinckerhoff, and Fiske Halls
