= Deborah Feltz =

American kinesiologist and sport psychologist

- Born: Deborah Louise Feltz
- Education: University at Buffalo; Pennsylvania State University
- Scientific career
- Fields: Kinesiology, sport psychology
- Workplaces: Michigan State University
- Doctoral students: Sian Beilock

Deborah Louise Feltz is an American kinesiologist and sport psychologist whose research focuses on self-efficacy, anxiety, and their effects on sport performance. She joined MSU's Department of Kinesiology in 1980, later becoming a professor and chairperson, and has contributed to the study of collective and coaching efficacy, as well as to the development of measurement tools and collaborative research projects in sport psychology.

== Early life and education ==
Feltz was born to Vivian and Allen Feltz. She graduated from Springville-Griffith Institute in 1970. Feltz completed undergraduate studies in physical education at the University at Buffalo, graduating with a B.S. in 1974. The following year, she served as an instructor and coach at Ellicottville Central School. She attended Pennsylvania State University (PSU), earning a M.S. in physical education in 1976. Her thesis was titled, Effects of Observer Sex and Informational-Motivational Components of Model's Demonstration on Motor Performance. In 1980, Feltz earned a Ph.D. in physical education at PSU under the guidance of Daniel M. Landers. Her dissertation was titled, A Path Analysis of the Causal Elements in Bandura's Theory of Self-Efficacy and an Anxiety-Based Model of Avoidance Behavior.

== Career ==
In 1980, Feltz joined the Department of Kinesiology at Michigan State University (MSU) as an assistant professor, specializing in sport psychology. By 1984, she earned an adjunct position in the Department of Psychology and became an associate professor. Her research primarily focused on self-efficacy, anxiety, and their impacts on sport performance, including the psychological effects of youth sports.

Her early work included studying self-efficacy in high-avoidance motor tasks, published extensively in refereed journals such as the Journal of Sport Psychology and Research Quarterly for Exercise and Sport. Her 1981 dissertation received the outstanding dissertation award from the Sport Psychology Academy of the National Association of Sport and Physical Education (NASPE). In 1985, Feltz was awarded the early career distinguished scholar award from the North American Society for the Psychology of Sport and Physical Activity.

In 1989, Feltz became a professor and chairperson of the Department of Kinesiology at MSU, a role she held for 17 years. During that same year, she was named a fellow of the American Psychological Association (APA) in Division 47, exercise and sport psychology. Her administrative contributions included overseeing program expansions and developing the undergraduate specialization in athletic training. She facilitated partnerships with Lansing Community College and established a student exchange program with the College of Ripon and York St John. In 1990, Feltz was listed as a classic author in the Journal of Sport and Exercise Psychology.

In 1992, Feltz was inducted into the American Academy of Kinesiology and Physical Education. Feltz investigated collective efficacy and coaching efficacy, developing models and measurement tools that became widely adopted. Her research includes collaborative projects such as the Center for Physical Activity and Health, launched in 2003 with MSU's Department of Epidemiology. Feltz co-developed the Coaching Efficacy Scale-II and collaborated with researchers, including Sandra E. Short, Philip Sullivan, and Melissa Chase, on collective efficacy and sport confidence studies, furthering research on gender differences, athletic performance, and team dynamics in sports. Feltz received the MSU distinguished faculty award in 1992 and served on the Committee on Techniques for the Enhancement of Human Performance with the National Research Council from 1991 to 1993.
