= Jacquelyn Mattfeld =

American musicologist (1925–2024)

Jacquelyn Anderson Mattfeld (October 5, 1925 – December 28, 2023) was an American musicologist and academic administrator. She served as president of Barnard College from 1976 to 1980.

== Life and career ==
Born in Baltimore, she studied at the Peabody Conservatory and Goucher College before completing her PhD at the Yale School of Music in 1959. Her early research focused on Renaissance music, including Josquin des Prez. However, she was unable to find an academic appointment, instead teaching piano privately, until she was hired as associate director of financial aid at Radcliffe College. The remainder of her academic career was administrative; she served as associate dean of student affairs at the Massachusetts Institute of Technology, provost and dean of faculty at Sarah Lawrence College, and a dean and later associate provost at Brown University, before being appointed president of Barnard in 1976. In 1979 she received the Wilbur Cross Medal from Yale University.

Mattfeld was hired at Barnard in large part to respond to the college's continuing financial problems, owing to her reputation as a budgetary expert. She addressed these difficulties by raising tuition, but was nevertheless able to increase the application rate to the college. Despite her effective financial leadership, however, she was fired after four years. She was subsequently appointed provost and dean of faculty at the College of Charleston. She later developed an interest in gerontology, which she pursued in part as executive director of the C. G. Jung Center in Evanston, Illinois; following her retirement, the Center appointed her Board Member Emeritus.

As an academic administrator, Mattfeld developed a reputation for blunt, even pugnacious candor, declaring on her departure from Brown, "We don't accomplish things. We sit around for half an hour talking about whether or not it was a mistake to spend $56,000 for a house on Humpty-Dumpty Street." At Barnard, she clashed with Columbia University administrators and her own board over her (successful) resistance to the college's takeover by Columbia. Describing herself as "militant" in response to institutionalized sexism and classism in elite universities, she was throughout her career an advocate for enhanced student services and expanded outreach to students from less affluent backgrounds. She also argued for the necessary overlap between professional education and the liberal arts.

Mattfeld died in Edgewater, New Jersey on December 28, 2023, at the age of 98.
