= Rosemary Park =

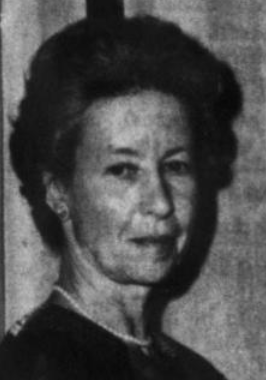
- Rosemary Park, from a 1964 publication of the US State Department
- Born: March 11, 1907; Andover, Massachusetts
- Died: April 17, 2004 (aged 97)
- Education: Radcliffe College (AB); University of Bonn (MA); University of Cologne (PhD)
- Occupations: College professor, college president, university vice-chancellor

Rosemary Park (March 11, 1907 – April 17, 2004) was an American scholar, academic leader, advocate for women's education and the first American woman to become president of two colleges and vice chancellor of a major university. During her career Park served as the 5th president of Connecticut College from 1947 to 1962, the 6th president of Barnard College from 1962 to 1967 and the first female vice chancellor in the University of California system at UCLA from 1967 to 1970.

== Early life and education ==
Rosemary Park, the youngest of four children, was born on March 11, 1907, in Andover, Massachusetts, into a family of educators. Her mother, Grace Lina Burtt Park taught Greek and Mathematics at the high school level. Her father, Dr. J. Edgar Park was president of Wheaton College from 1926 to 1944. Her brother, Dr. William E. Park, likewise served as president of Simmons College in Boston from 1955 to 1970. From an early age Park showed an interest in academia, studying German in high school, a field which at the time was mainly dominated by men. After high school Park went on to earn her bachelor's degree from Radcliffe College, graduating summa cum laude with a major in German. After graduating Park was able to continue her education by studying in Germany, first at the University of Bonn where she earned her masters in 1929 and then at the University of Cologne where she completed a dissertation on Richard Wagner, "The Image of Richard Wagner’s Tristan and Isolde in German Literature" earning her PhD in 1934.

== Career ==
=== Connecticut College ===
After a short period spent teaching at Wheaton College, Park transitioned to Connecticut College, entering the college as a professor of German in 1934. During her tenure at Connecticut College, Park went on to hold a number of positions including Dean of Freshmen, Academic Dean, and acting President before finally becoming President in 1947. During her 30-year tenure at Conn, 15 as President, Park was responsible for a number of major changes to the college including the restructuring of the curriculum, the growth of the college by 500 students (for comparison the college now has an estimated 1,865 students), the addition of 10,000,000 worth of new infrastructure including the school's health center, student center, a laboratory building and 8 new student dormitories. In addition, Park was instrumental in the 1959 transition of Connecticut College from a solely women's college to a co-educational institution, a decision which stemmed both from community need and the benefits it would bring both to the college as a whole and to its female students Lastly, Park, a dedicated fundraiser, was able to raise over $3 million for the college through the 50th Anniversary Fund through her extensive public relations and fundraising efforts.

Under Park's guidance Connecticut College went through two major curriculum revisions, first in 1953 and again in 1961–1962. In 1953, 6 years after assuming the Presidency, Park eliminated a number of vocationally oriented programs including home economics and clerical skills which she felt were not up to the standards of a rigorous liberal arts education. Park sought to bolster the college's standing as an "intellectually pure" institutional through the addition of courses in English composition and literature, American and European history, government, laboratory sciences, philosophy, religion, foreign languages, music and art, and mathematics and logic. This curriculum, which mandated five courses a semester was eventually deemed to be too demanding of students and in 1962 the requirements were reduced to only four courses a semester, theoretically allowing the students to produce higher-quality more focused work. This less-drastic curriculum revision maintained many of the same requirements and offerings as the 1953 revision while reinforcing Park's goal of academic seriousness and vigor at the College.

=== Barnard College ===
In 1962, after 30 years at Connecticut College and 15 as President, Park made the decision to resign from her position and to accept the position of President at Barnard College, at the time the sister college to Columbia University. During her relatively brief tenure as President of Barnard (1962–1967) Park sought to implement a number of reforms similar to those undergone at Connecticut College. Park focused heavily on curriculum reform, reviewing existing courses and reducing requirements with the intention of improving the quality of student work. In 1966, a year before Park left the institution, these reforms were officially put in place thereby reducing the five course minimum requirement to four per semester and mandated 32 required courses overall. In addition, although a less tangible achievement Park focused heavily on improving student involvement at the college, setting up channels for students to influence policies on discipline, student activities, and the curriculum. In relation to student welfare, Park heavily encouraged female participation in the sciences, working to obtain a laboratory for the College independent from Columbia's facilities. Overall, she encouraged her female students to pursue traditionally rigorous subjects in the sciences and the field of linguistics, believing that women were equally as capable as their male colleagues to excel in such areas.

=== University of California, Los Angeles ===
Despite her desire to continue serving as President of Barnard, Park resigned from the college in 1967 after her 1965 marriage. Park and her husband, Milton Anastos, a professor of Byzantine Greek at UCLA, hoped to find Anastos a position in New York, acknowledging the relative ease in obtaining a position as a professor in comparison to that of college president. However, Anastos was unable to find a suitable position, despite Columbia University's offer of a position teaching both Byzantine Greek and Russian history, the latter of which was not his area of expertise. Thus, in 1967 Park made the decision to resign from her position as President and to accept the position of first female vice-chancellor of UCLA under Chancellor Franklin Murphy. As Vice Chancellor Park focused mainly on reviewing the university's academic curriculum and programs based on her numerous years of expertise at both Connecticut College and Barnard. In addition, she was asked to establish a disciplinary code in collaboration with students at the law school, in many ways in response to the students uprisings and protests of the mid to late 1960s. Eventually, after three years working as Vice Chancellor Park stepped down from the position, however she continued her work as a professor of higher education at the graduate school until her official retirement in 1974.

== Personal life ==
Rosemary Park married only once in her life at age 58 to Milton Vasil Anastos (age 56) a professor of Byzantine Greek at the University of California Los Angeles. The couple wed on August 1, 1965, Park in Greenwich, Connecticut. While Park had no biological children of her own, Anastos had one child from his first marriage, Milton V. Anastos Jr, Park's stepson. The pair lived together in California until Anastos died in 1997. Park, who died on April 17, 2004, at the age of 97, is survived by her stepson as well as a number of nieces and nephews.

== Community and organizational involvement ==
Throughout her life Park maintained an active interest in a number of community organizations both related to and separate from her work in academia. Below is a summary of some of the many positions Park held during her lifetime, often in conjunction with her administrative duties at Connecticut College, Barnard and UCLA.

- Lyman Allyn Museum (director)
- New London Chamber of Commerce (director)
- Fund for the Advancement of Education (Ford Foundation (Member, National Committee on Faculty Fellowships)
- Connecticut Higher Education assistance Corporation (Incorporator)
- American College for Girls (advisor)
- The Masters School (Trustee)
- University of Hartford (Member, Board of Regents)
- United Chapters of Phi Beta Kappa (Senator at Large)
- New England College Fund (vice-president)
- Genera Motors National Scholarship Committee (Member)
- John Hay Whitney Foundation (Member)
- Association of American Colleges (Member, Board of Directors)
- Institute of American Colleges (Member, Board of Directors)
- Institute of International Education (Member, Advisory Committee of College and University Presidents)
- Rockefeller Brothers Theological Fellowship Program (Member, Board of Directors)
- Connecticut State Board of Mental Health (Member)
- The Mystic Oral School for the Deaf (Trustee)
- Williams Memorial Institute (Administrator and Trustee)
- Institute of Living (Corporator)
- Lawrence Memorial Hospital (Member and Corporator)
- American Academy of Arts and Sciences (Member, Committee on International Relations)
- Connecticut Arboretum (Member, Advisory Committee)
- American Association of University Professors (Member)

== Awards and recognition ==
=== Honorary degrees ===
- Wesleyan University (1948)
- Mount Holyoke College (1955)
- Douglass College (1950)
- Yale University (1958)
- Bridgeport University (1962)
- Brown University (1962)
- Columbia University (1962)
- New York University (1962)
- Goucher College (1963)
- Oberlin College (1963)
- University of Pennsylvania (1964)
- University of Hartford (1965)
- Syracuse University (1965)
- University of Massachusetts (1968)

=== Honors and awards ===
- Los Angeles Times Woman of the Year (1968)
- Connecticut College Rosemary Park Fellowship (created in her honor)
