= Riverside Church =

Interdenominational church in Manhattan, New York

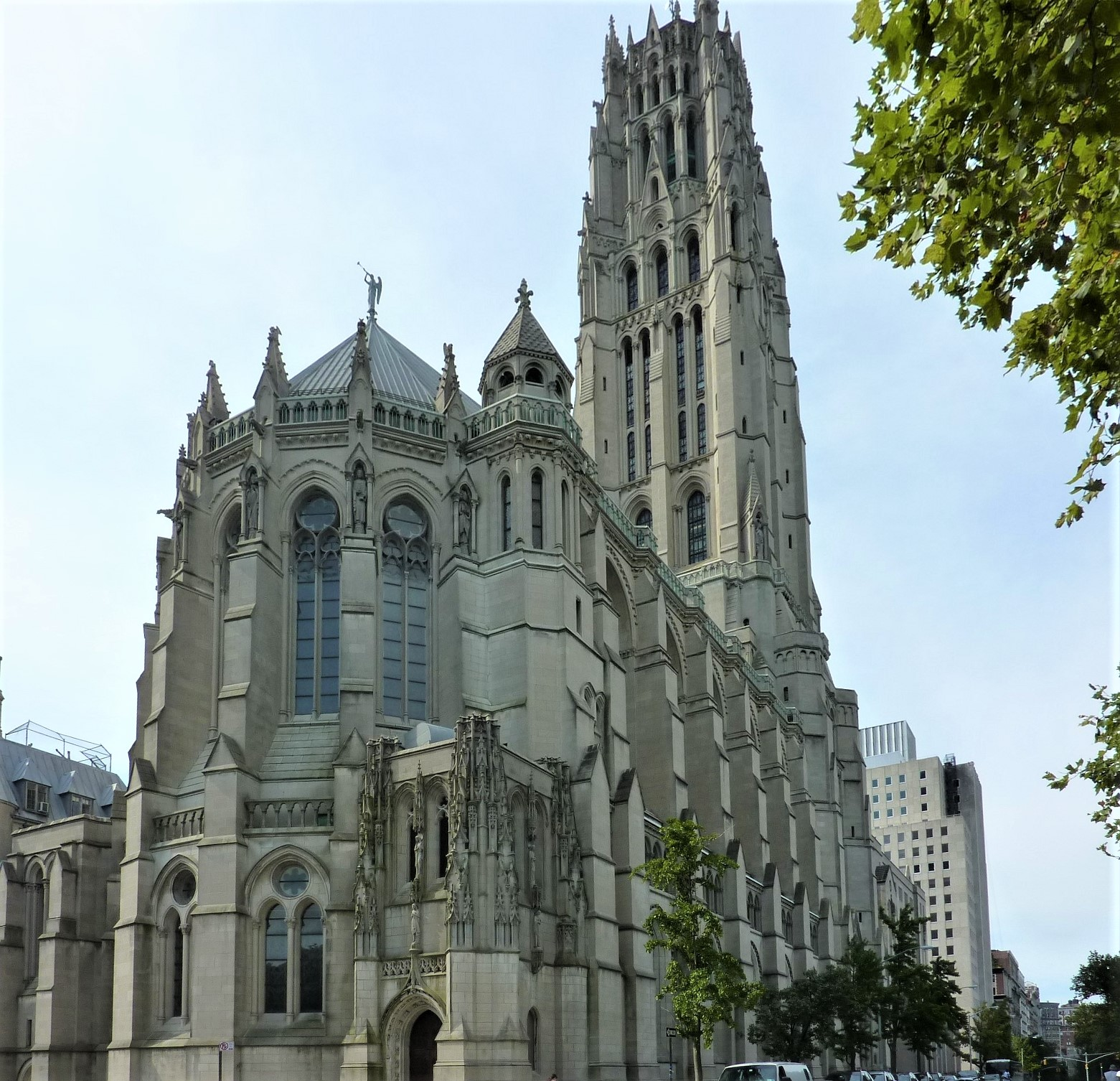
- Riverside Church in 2013

- Location within Manhattan Location within New York City Location within New York Location within the United States
- 40°48′43″N 73°57′47″W
- Location: New York City
- Country: United States
- Denomination: Interdenominational: ABCUSA; Association of Welcoming and Affirming Baptists; UCC

History
- Former name(s): Mulberry Street Baptist Church; Fifth Avenue Baptist Church; Park Avenue Baptist Church
- Founded: 1823

Architecture
- Heritage designation: National Register of Historic Places, New York City Landmarks Preservation Commission
- Architect(s): Allen & Collens and Henry C. Pelton
- Architectural type: Neo-Gothic
- Groundbreaking: November 21, 1927; 98 years ago
- Completed: October 5, 1930; 96 years ago

Specifications
- Capacity: 2,100
- Riverside Church
- U.S. National Register of Historic Places
- New York State Register of Historic Places
- New York City Landmark
- Location: 478, 490 Riverside Dr. & 81 Claremont Ave., Manhattan, New York
- Built: 1930 (main building); 1957 (MLK Wing); 1962 (conversion of Stone Gym)
- Architects: Allen & Collens, Henry C. Pelton (main building); Collens, Willis & Beckonert (MLK Wing); Louis E. Jallade (Stone Gym)
- Architectural style: Late Gothic Revival
- Website: www.trcnyc.org
- NRHP reference No.: 12001036
- NYSRHP No.: 06101.001261
- NYCL No.: 2037

Significant dates
- Added to NRHP: December 12, 2012
- Designated NYSRHP: October 18, 2012
- Designated NYCL: May 16, 2000

Riverside Church is an interdenominational church in the Morningside Heights neighborhood of Manhattan in New York City, United States. The church is associated with the American Baptist Churches USA, the Association of Welcoming and Affirming Baptists and the United Church of Christ. The present church building was conceived by philanthropist businessman and Baptist John D. Rockefeller Jr. in conjunction with Baptist minister Harry Emerson Fosdick, designated to be a large, interdenominational church in Morningside Heights, which is surrounded by academic institutions.

The church occupies the block bounded by Riverside Drive, Claremont Avenue, 120th Street, and 122nd Street near Columbia University's Morningside Heights campus and across from Grant's Tomb. The original building opened in 1930; it was designed by Henry C. Pelton and Allen & Collens in the Neo-Gothic style. It contains a nave consisting of five architectural bays; a chancel at the front of the nave; a 22-story, 392-foot (119 m) tower above the nave; a narthex and chapel; and a cloistered passageway that connects to the eastern entrance on Claremont Avenue. Near the top of the tower is the church's main feature, a 74-bell carillon—the heaviest in the world—dedicated to Rockefeller Jr.'s mother Laura Spelman Rockefeller. A seven-story wing was built to the south of the original building in 1959 to a design by Collens, Willis & Beckonert, and was renamed for Martin Luther King Jr. in 1985. The Stone Gym to the southeast, built in 1915 as a dormitory, was designed by Louis E. Jallade and was converted to a gymnasium in 1962.

Riverside Church has been a focal point of global and national activism since its inception, and it has a long history of social justice in adherence to Fosdick's original vision of an "interdenominational, interracial, and international" church. Its congregation includes members of more than forty ethnic groups. The church was designated as a city landmark by the New York City Landmarks Preservation Commission in 2000 and was listed on the National Register of Historic Places in 2012.

== History ==
=== Context ===
==== Congregation ====
Several small Baptist congregations, including the Mulberry Street Baptist Church that was established in 1823 by a group of 16 congregants, were founded in Manhattan after the American Revolutionary War. The Mulberry Street church occupied at least three locations on the Lower East Side and two locations on Broadway in Midtown Manhattan before moving to a more permanent site at Fifth Avenue and 46th Street in the 1860s. The businessman William Rockefeller was the first of several Rockefeller family members to attend the Fifth Avenue Baptist Church; he became a major financial backer of the church in the 1870s. William and his brother John D. Rockefeller later became trustees of the church and many of its services were held at the Rockefellers' home nearby.

Cornelius Woelfkin, who became the church's minister in 1912, started leading the church in a more modernist direction. By the early 20th century, Fifth Avenue was experiencing increased commercial development and the church building became dilapidated. The congregation sold its old headquarters in 1919 and bought land at Park Avenue and 63rd Street the following year. John Rockefeller's son John D. Rockefeller Jr. funded half of the projected $1 million cost. The new church, which was dubbed the "Little Cathedral", was designed by Henry C. Pelton in partnership with Francis R. Allen and Charles Collens. The final service in the Fifth Avenue location was held on April 3, 1922, and the renamed Park Avenue Baptist Church held its first class in the new location the next week.

==== Progressive ideology ====
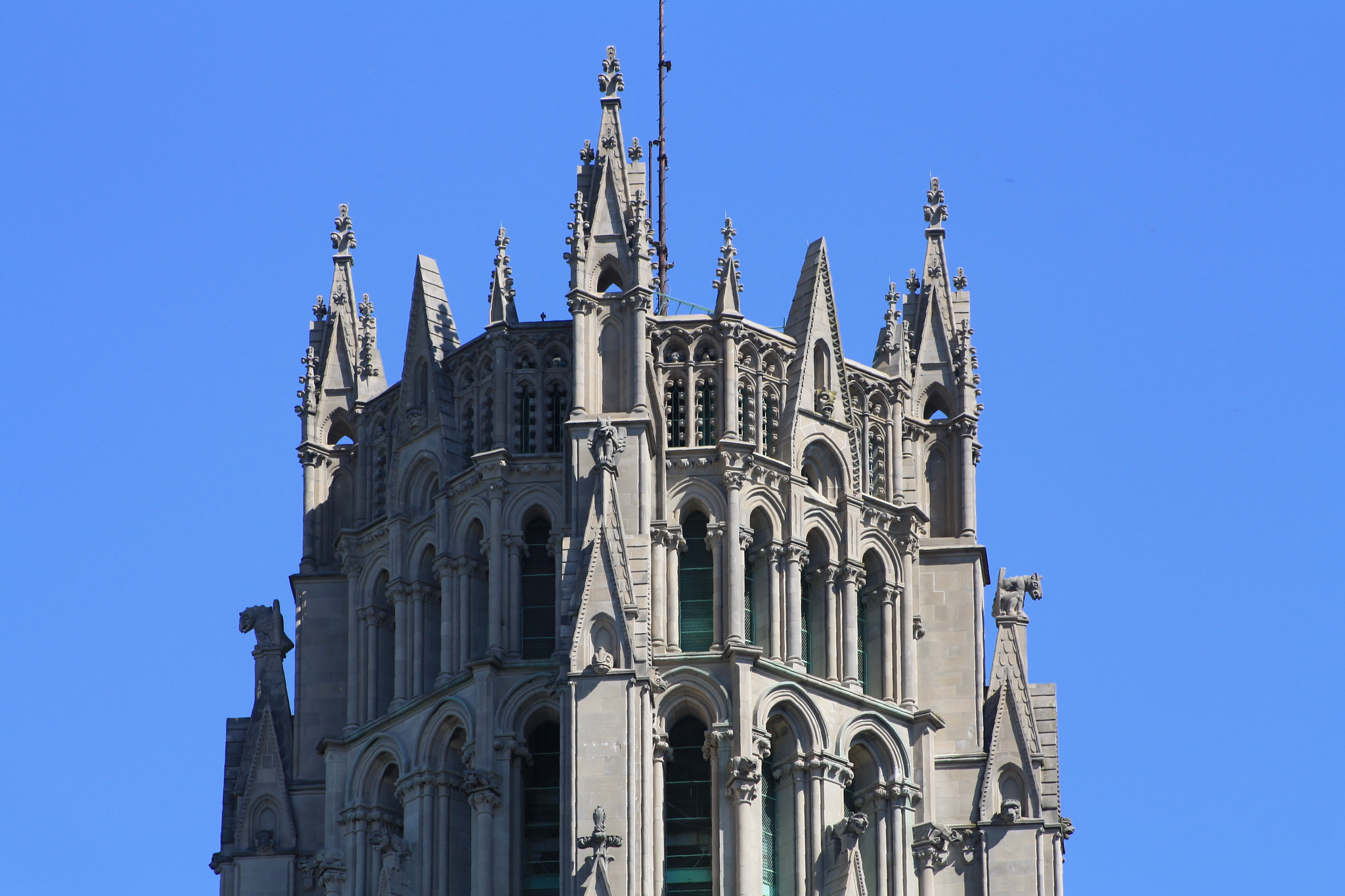
Detail of the tower's crown

In 1924, John D. Rockefeller Jr. donated $500,000 to the Cathedral of St. John the Divine in Morningside Heights, which was further uptown from the Park Avenue location, in an unsuccessful attempt to influence the cathedral's ideology in a progressive direction. The following January, Harry E. Edmonds—leader of the International House in Morningside Heights for whose construction Rockefeller had provided funds—wrote to Rockefeller to propose creating a new church in the neighborhood. Edmonds suggested progressive pastor Harry Emerson Fosdick should head such a church. Rockefeller then told the Park Avenue Baptist Church's leaders about the plan and hired an agent to inspect the planned church site.

Woelfkin quit in mid-May 1925 and Rockefeller Jr. immediately started looking for a new minister, ultimately deciding on Fosdick, who had declined Rockefeller's offers several times, saying he did not "want to be known as the pastor of the richest man in the country". Fosdick stated he would accept the minister position on the conditions that the church would move to Morningside Heights, follow a policy of religious liberalism, remove the requirement for members to be baptized, and become nondenominational. At the end of May 1925, Fosdick agreed to become minister of the Park Avenue Baptist Church. Only fifteen percent of congregants voted against Fosdick's appointment.

Under Fosdick's leadership, the congregation doubled in size by 1930. The new members were diverse; of the 158 people who joined in the year after Fosdick became minister, about half were not Baptists. Though some existing congregants had doubts about whether the Park Avenue Baptist Church should move from its recently completed edifice, the church's board, which was in favor of the relocation, stated congregants would not have to pay any of the costs for the new church.

=== Planning and construction ===
==== Site selection ====
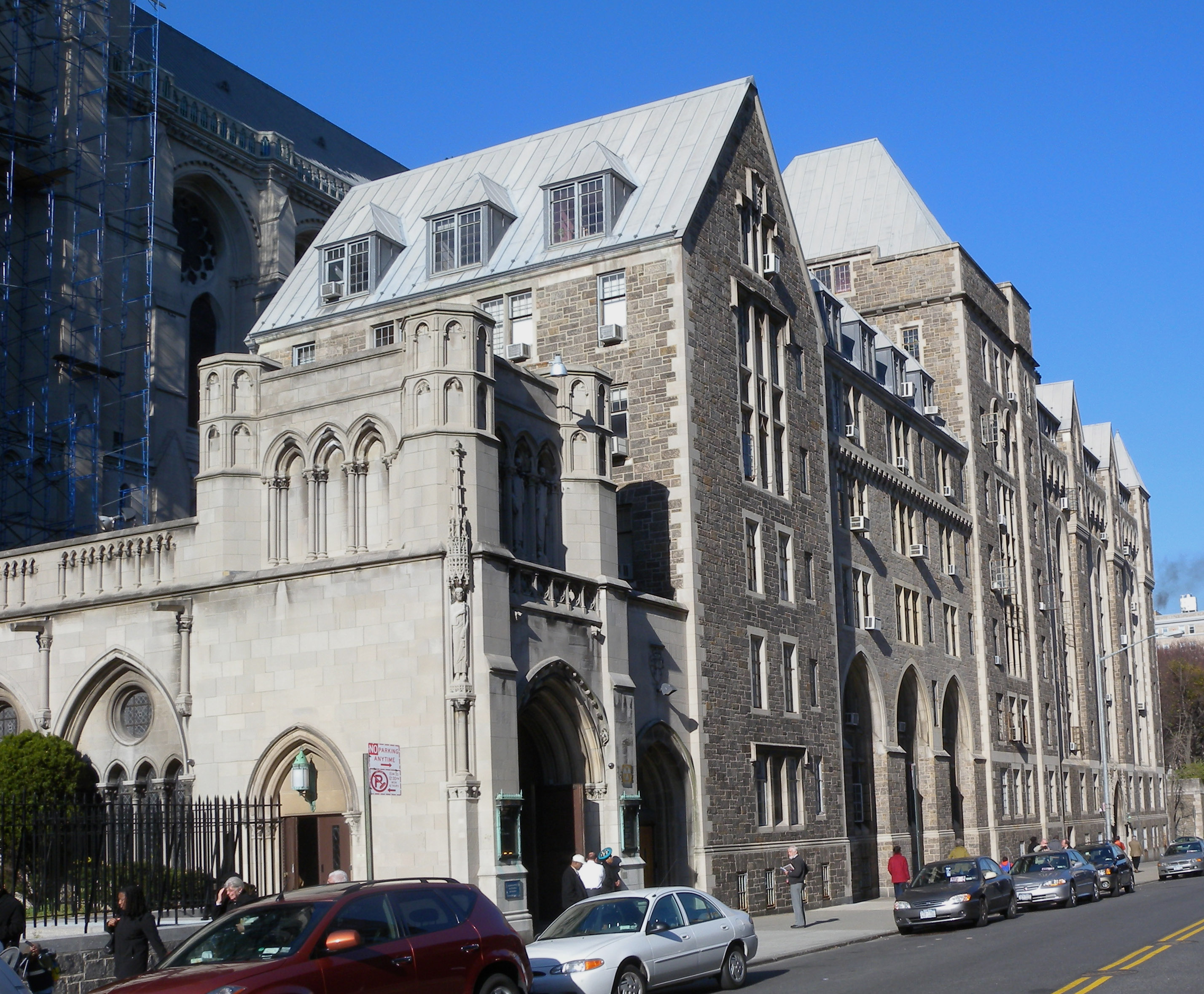
Claremont Avenue view

Morningside Heights, where the new church was to be located, was being quickly developed as a residential neighborhood surrounded by numerous higher-education institutions, including Union Theological Seminary and International House of New York. The development had been spurred by the presence of Riverside Park and Riverside Drive nearby, as well as the construction of the New York City Subway's Broadway–Seventh Avenue Line—the modern-day 1 train—under Broadway. Rockefeller briefly considered a location on Morningside Drive on the eastern edge of Morningside Heights, between 117th and 118th Streets. He ultimately chose a larger site at the southeastern corner of Riverside Drive and 122nd Street on the neighborhood's western border, which overlooked Riverside Park to the west and Claremont Park to the north. Rockefeller felt the Riverside Drive site was more easily visible because it abutted the Hudson River and would be seen by recreational users of Riverside Drive.

In May 1925, Rockefeller finalized his purchase of the new church's site at Riverside Drive. That July, he exchanged his previous purchase of a plot on Morningside Drive for another plot on Riverside Drive. Shortly afterward, he acquired yet more land, after which he had a frontage of 250 ft (76 meters) on Riverside Drive for the new church. At the time of the acquisition, three apartment buildings and two mansions occupied the church's future site. Rockefeller wished to keep the apartments in place for several years to fund the church's eventual construction.

==== Planning ====
Rockefeller was the chairman of the committee tasked with developing a new building for the church. Hoping to avoid publicity, rather than host an architectural competition, he privately asked several architectural firms to submit plans for the building. (Note: These firms included McKim, Mead & White, Allen & Collens, Henry C. Pelton, Ralph Adams Cram, and York and Sawyer.) Rockefeller tried to downplay his role in the planning and construction process, asking for his name to be omitted from media reports and discussion of the church, though with little success. His role in the selection process raised concerns from church trustees, including Fosdick, who believed such close financial involvement could place the church in "a very vulnerable position". John Roach Straton, pastor of Calvary Baptist Church on 57th Street in Midtown Manhattan, criticized Rockefeller's involvement and mockingly suggested it be called the Socony Church after the oil company the Rockefellers headed. George S. Chappell, writing in The New Yorker under the pseudonym "T-Square", said the project "was known to most secular minds as the Rockefeller Cathedral".

Neither Rockefeller nor Fosdick had strict requirements for the church's architectural style. Rockefeller asked for the new building to include space for the Park Avenue Baptist Church's carillon, which he had donated. Most of the plans entailed a church facing 122nd Street and wrapping around the existing apartment buildings on the site. The exception was a plan by Allen & Collens and Henry C. Pelton—who had designed Park Avenue Baptist Church—that called for a Gothic Revival church with its main entrance on the side, facing Riverside Drive, with a bell tower and apartment towers for the neighboring Union Theological Seminary. The building committee removed the apartment towers from the church plan and Allen, Collens, and Pelton were selected to design the new church in February 1926. As part of the plans, there would be a 375-foot (114 m)—later 392-foot (119 m)—bell tower, a 2,400-seat auditorium, and athletic rooms. The building would occupy a 100 feet (30 m) by 225 feet (69 m) lot. There was no room for a chapel in the original plans so Rockefeller proposed trading land with the Union Theological Seminary. In May 1926, Rockefeller gave Union an apartment building on 99 Claremont Avenue, to the northeast of the church. In exchange, Riverside Church received a small plot to its south, allowing for the construction of the chapel and a proposed cloister passage to Claremont Avenue.

Rockefeller chose to delay the construction process until the leases of the site's existing tenants expired in October 1926. The official plans were filed with the New York City Department of Buildings in November that year. The following month, the congregation voted to approve the building plans at a cost of $4 million. Pelton and Collens then went to France to look for churches upon which to model Riverside Church's design. They eventually selected the 13th-century Chartres Cathedral as their model.

==== Construction ====
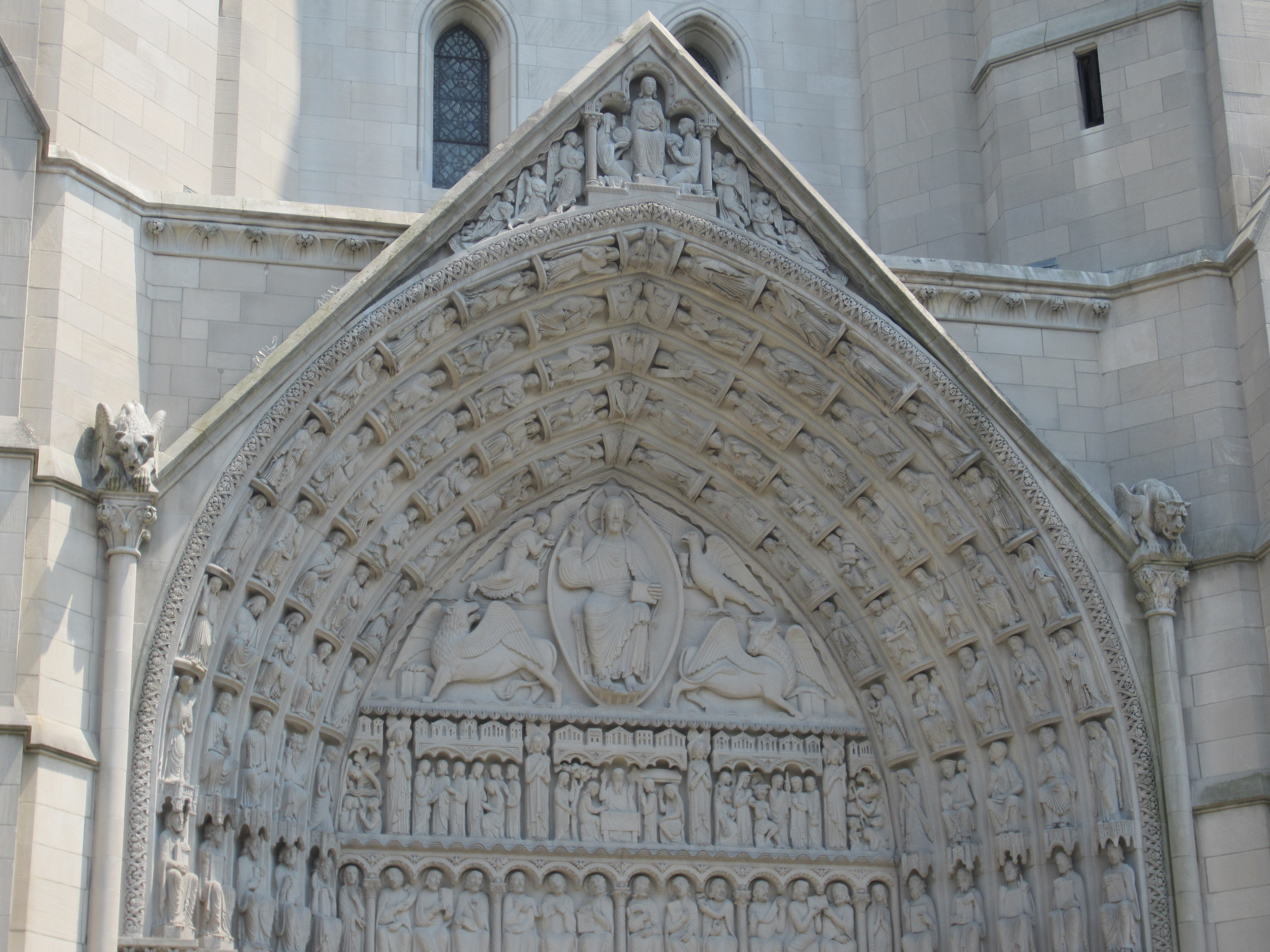
Archivolts in the front doorway

Marc Eidlitz & Son, Inc. was hired as the contractor for the construction of the new Riverside Drive church. On November 21, 1927, the church's ceremonial cornerstone was laid, marking the start of construction. The cornerstone included items such as Woelfkin's Bible and New York Times articles about the new church. The Park Avenue church building and three adjacent rowhouses was sold for $1.5 million in April 1928. The same month, Park Avenue Baptist Church's official monthly newsletter announced its existing 53-bell carillon would be expanded to 72 bells upon its relocation to Riverside Drive, making it the largest set of bells in the world.

In late 1928, three fires occurred after wooden scaffolding around the new church was ignited. On December 22, 1928, one of these fires caused $1 million in damage and almost completely destroyed the interior, though the exterior remained mostly intact. Much of the damage was covered by an insurance policy placed on the building. Shortly after the December 1928 fire, Rockefeller announced he would continue with construction after insurance claims were settled. The fire delayed the completion of the interior by six months. In February 1929, the congregation began seeking donations to continue construction; Rockefeller donated $1.5 million, which when combined with the proceeds from the sale of the Park Avenue building, provided $3 million in funds. Construction of a mortuary at the Riverside Drive church was approved in March 1929. While construction was ongoing, the congregation temporarily relocated to Temple Beth-El on Fifth Avenue and 76th Street for nine months starting in July 1929.

The first portion of the new church building to be completed, the assembly hall under the auditorium, opened in October 1929. That December, Fosdick formally filed plans to rename the church from "Park Avenue Baptist Church" to "Riverside Church". The bell was hoisted to the top of the tower's carillon in early September 1930, the tower was completed later that month, and the first Sunday school class was held there on September 29. The church was completed on October 5, the same day the first service was held in the altar; it was attended by 3,200 people. All of the space in the nave and basement was filled and thousands more people wished to enter. The next month, officials received two oil paintings from Rockefeller Jr.'s collection. The first officers of Riverside Church were elected in December 1930 and the church was formally dedicated with an interdenominational service two months later. The total cost of construction was estimated at $4 million. In the early years of the new building, journalists often referred to the church in association with either Rockefeller—who sought to reduce emphasis on his role at the church—or Fosdick. Riverside Church's completion sharply contrasted with the Cathedral of St. John the Divine, which remained incomplete after almost four decades. Allen & Collens's plan was described by architect Robert A. M. Stern as the culmination of a "craving for a tall cathedral among people of everyday tall ideas", which had started when St. John's was proposed in 1889.

Despite the completion of Riverside Church, Rockefeller felt the surroundings still needed to be improved. In 1932, he announced he would pay for a $350,000 landscaping of the adjacent, decrepit Sakura Park. Rockefeller hired the Olmsted Brothers to renovate the park and the project was completed two years later. When Union Theological Seminary announced it would build a new apartment building at 99 Claremont Avenue. Rockefeller offered to exchange his neighboring apartment building at 122nd Street and Claremont Avenue for the lots south of the church, which were owned by the seminary. The land was swapped in 1931 after Rockefeller offered to finance part of the dormitory's construction. In 1935, the land under the church was deeded to Rockefeller and he purchased a lot at Riverside Drive and 122nd Street from St. Luke's Hospital, after which he owned all of the land along the eastern side of Riverside Drive between 120th and 122nd Streets. Rockefeller spent a total of $10.5 million on land acquisition and church construction.

=== Use ===
==== 1930s through mid-1960s ====
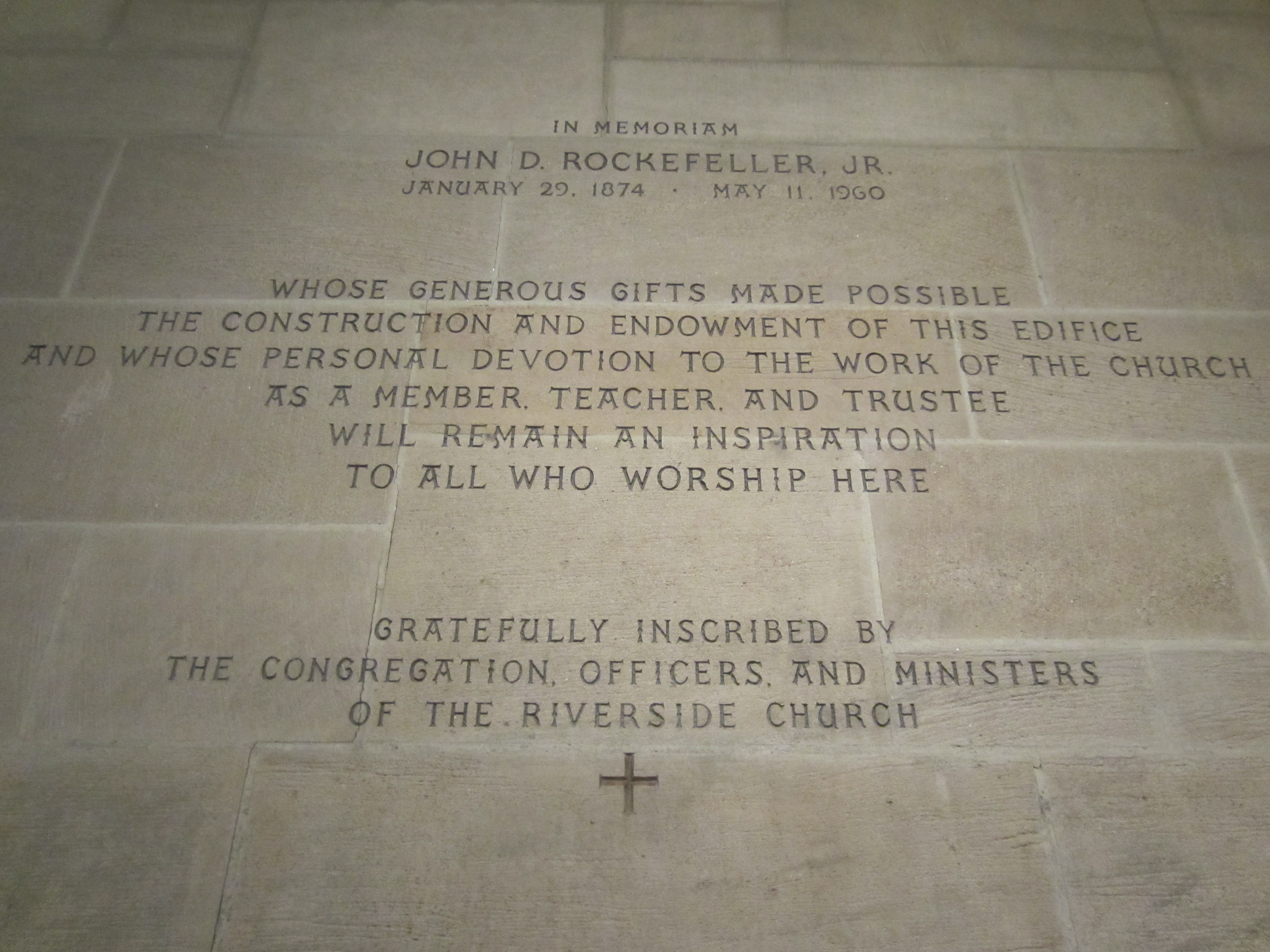
John D. Rockefeller Jr. funded much of the church's construction.

The completion of the new church building at Morningside Heights resulted in a steady increase in the congregation's membership. By May 1946, the congregation had 3,500 members, an increase of 800 in twenty years. According to a brochure issued by the church, "soon every room ... was in use seven days a week", and enrollment at the church's Sunday school had correspondingly increased.

Riverside Church became a community icon and a religious center of Morningside Heights. By 1939, the church had more than 200 staff in both part-time and full-time positions, and over 10,000 people a week were attending its social and religious services, athletic events, and employment programs. In addition to its well-attended Sunday morning service, Riverside Church hosted Communion services every first Sunday afternoon, as well as Ministry of Music services on other Sunday afternoons. The Riverside Guild, the young-adult fellowship, held worship services during Sunday evenings. Weddings and funerals were also hosted at the church. In 1942, the United States Naval Reserve Midshipmen's School at Columbia started using Riverside Church for services, drawing 2,000 attendees on average, and continued to hold its services at the church until October 1945.

In June 1945, Fosdick announced he would step down as senior minister the following May. This spurred a search for a new pastor and in March 1946, Robert James McCracken was chosen for the position and officially became the senior pastor of Riverside Church that October. Fosdick and McCracken held each other in mutual respect so the transition between ministers went smoothly. Over the next two decades, McCracken continued Fosdick's policy of religious liberalism. In 1956, halfway through McCracken's tenure, the church conducted an internal report and found the organizational structure was disorganized and that most staff did not feel any single person was in charge. As a result, six councils were created and placed under the purview of the deacons and trustees. The councils partitioned power into "a series of mini-kingdoms", according to a later pastor, Ernest T. Campbell.

Construction on the Martin Luther King Jr. Wing, to the south of the existing church, started in 1955. The seven-story wing was designed by Collens, Willis & Beckonert, successors to Allen & Collens; its $15 million cost was funded by Rockefeller. The wing was dedicated in December 1959 and contained additional facilities for the church's programs. A 15-foot (4.6 m) dummy antenna had been placed on top of Riverside Church's 392-foot (119 m)-tall carillon earlier that year to determine whether it could be used by Columbia University's radio station, WKCR (89.9 MHz FM), despite strong opposition from parishioners and the local community. Nevertheless, the church decided to place an antenna atop the carillon for its own radio station, the top of the antenna being 440 feet (130 m) above ground level. Riverside Church started operating the radio station WRVR (106.7 MHz FM) in 1961 and continued to operate it until 1976. In 1960, Riverside Church's congregation voted to join the United Church of Christ, the successor denomination to the Congregational Christian Churches. Rockefeller purchased the Stone Gym, an existing Union Theological Seminary building southeast of the original church, and reopened it as a community facility in April 1962 after a five-year renovation. In April 1967, McCracken announced he would leave his position as senior minister, citing health issues.

==== Late 1960s through 1990s ====
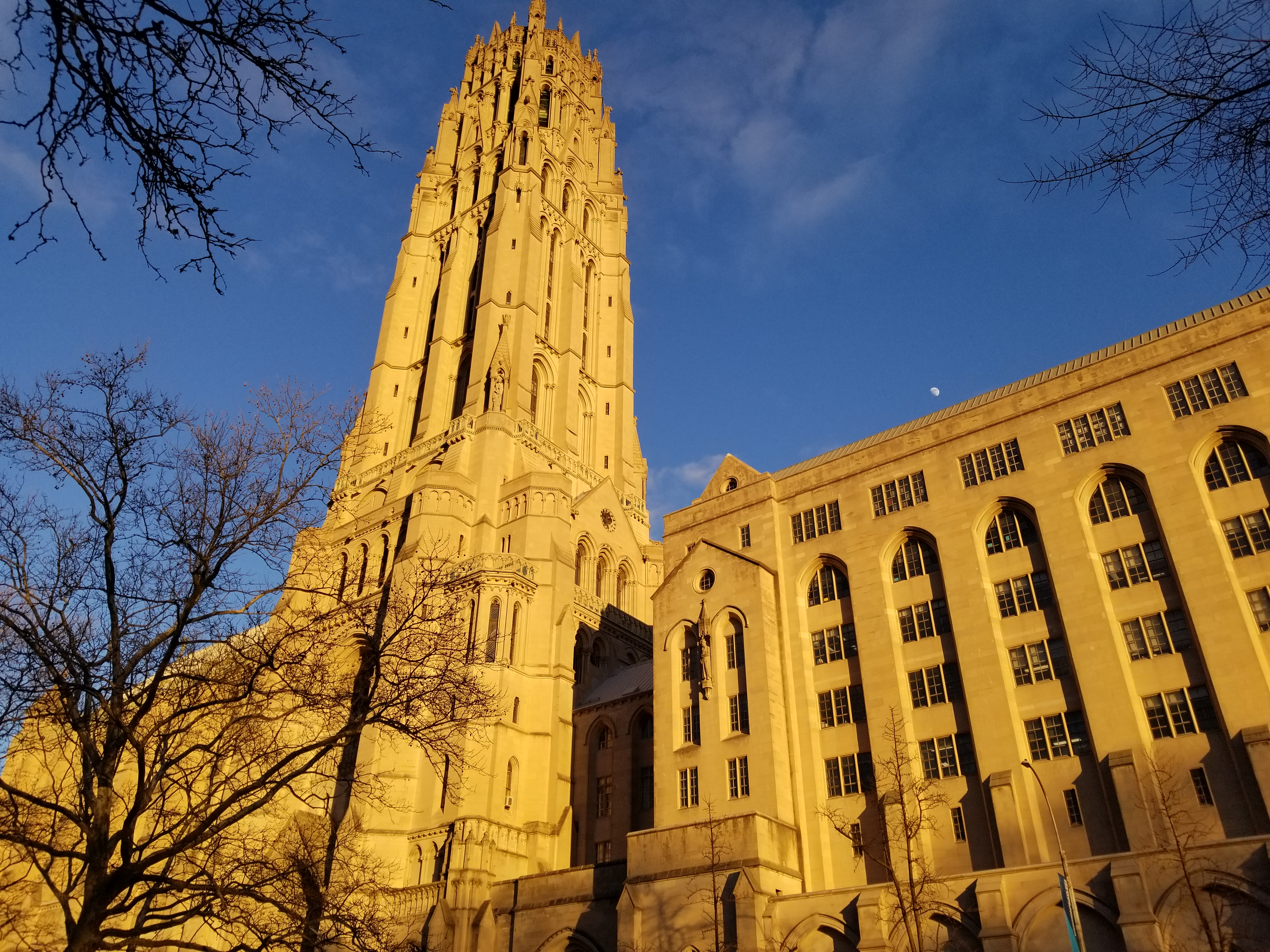
View from Riverside Drive, at dusk

Ernest T. Campbell became pastor in November 1968. Less than a year later, civil rights leader James Forman interrupted a sermon at Riverside Church, citing it as one of several churches from which Black Americans could ask for reparations for slavery. This led to the church releasing its financial figures in 1970 for the first time; the figures valued the building at $86 million and the total financial endowment of $18 million, as well as the creation of a $450,000 Fund for Social Justice to disburse reparations over three years. Following a 1972 metropolitan mission study, several ministries aimed toward ameliorating social conditions in the New York City area were formed at Riverside Church. Campbell's tenure was marked by several controversial sermons and increasing conflicts among the church's boards, councils, and staff. In June 1976, Campbell suddenly resigned, having felt his style of leadership was not sufficient to reconcile these disagreements. The same month saw the installment of the church's first female pastor, Evelyn Newman.

By a vote in August 1977, William Sloane Coffin was selected as the next senior minister of Riverside Church. Coffin officiated his first service in November 1977. At this point, the congregation's size had been declining for several years but after Coffin's selection as senior minister, membership increased to 2,627 by the end of 1979, and total annual attendance for morning services rose from 49,902 in 1976 to 71,536 in 1978. Coffin's tenure was also marked by theologically liberal sermons, many of which were controversial, though he was more traditional in his worship. This era also saw Channing E. Phillips, the first African-American major-party U.S. presidential nominee, being hired as minister of planning and coordination.

Coffin announced his intention to resign in July 1987 to become the president of disarmament organization SANE/Freeze, and held his last sermon that December. Riverside Church formed a committee that conducted a nationwide search for its next senior minister over the next year. In February 1989, the committee chose James A. Forbes, a professor at nearby Union Theological Seminary, for the position. The congregation voted almost unanimously to approve Forbes's selection and he became the church's first black senior minister. At the time, between one-fourth and one-third of the congregation was Black or Hispanic. Tensions between Forbes and executive minister David Dyson soon developed over matters including the duration of Forbes's sermons and his musical choices. Tensions grew and a mediator was engaged after Forbes tried to fire Dyson. The dispute was resolved when Dyson resigned in October 1992.

In 1996, Riverside Church started conducting a study on the building's current use and services, and the following October, Body Lawson, Ben Paul Associated Architects and Planners published the Riverside Church Master Plan. The plan included a major addition on Riverside Church's eastern side, consisting of the relocation of the Claremont Avenue entrance, paving of the forecourt, reconfiguration of the cloister lobby, and construction of a seven-story building over the gymnasium. This plan was controversial among congregants, some of whom petitioned the New York City Landmarks Preservation Commission (NYCLPC) to designate the church to prevent the alteration of the original appearance of the Claremont Avenue entrance. In December 1998, the congregation voted to officially nominate the church for landmark status. Only the original church building was nominated; the nomination excluded the Martin Luther King Jr. Wing, despite preservationists' requests for the entire structure to be considered for landmark designation. The NYCLPC approved landmark status for the original church in May 2000.

==== 21st century ====
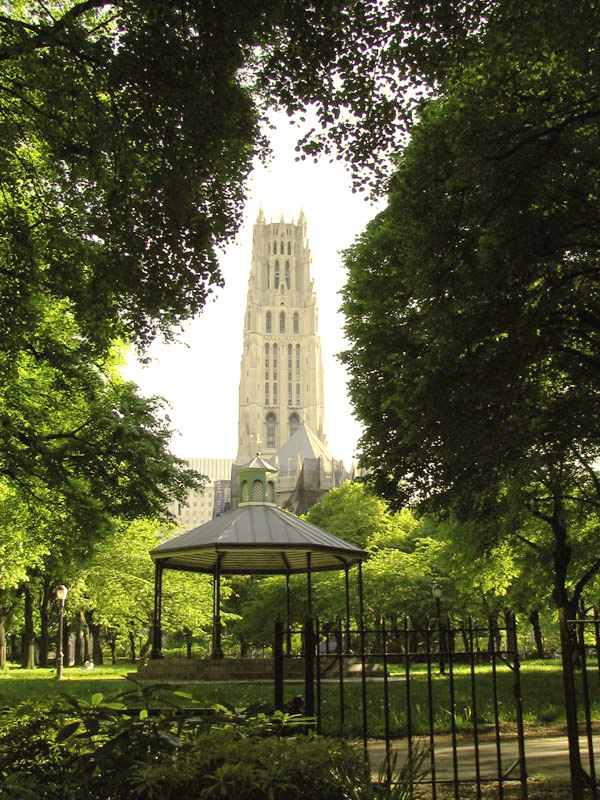
View from Sakura Park

A controversy involving Riverside Church that arose in the early 2000s involved the allegation of financial mismanagement due to a $32 million decrease in the endowment between 2000 and 2002. The accusation of financial mismanagement was prolonged through several years of court cases, although the New York Supreme Court had dismissed a lawsuit over the topic. Forbes announced his retirement in September 2006 and held his last sermon in June 2007. By that time, the church had 2,700 congregants, a large proportion of whom were black and Hispanic. The church had a $14 million annual operating budget and a paid staff of 130.

Another nationwide, year-long search for a new senior minister commenced and in August 2008, it was announced Brad Braxton had been selected as the sixth senior minister of Riverside Church. Braxton's tenure was marked by theological disputes; congregants disagreed whether the church should take a fundamentalist or progressive position, as well as a lawsuit over his salary, which a church spokesperson stated was $457,000. In June 2009, Braxton submitted a letter of resignation due to these disputes. For the next five years, Riverside Church had no senior minister and in 2014, its congregation had decreased to 1,670, a loss of over a thousand since 2007. In 2012, the church and its annexes were listed on the National Register of Historic Places.

In June 2014, Amy K. Butler was selected as the church's seventh, and the first female, senior minister. In September 2018, the church announced it would buy the neighboring McGiffert Hall at Claremont Avenue and 122nd Street for $45 million. The dormitory was on land John Rockefeller Jr. had donated to the Union Theological Seminary, and under the donation agreement, the church had the right of first offer to buy the building should it ever be offered for sale. In July 2019, the church's governing council announced Butler's contract would not be renewed, and the Church Council and Butler released a joint letter stating Butler's resignation was mutual. A former Church Council member later alleged Butler was dismissed after she and other female staff members had experienced sexual harassment by another former council member, Dr. Edward Lowe. Michael E. Livingston became the interim senior minister.

More than two dozen lawsuits from 27 plaintiffs were filed against the church under New York State's Child Victims Act of 2019; these lawsuits concerned the late Ernest Lorch, the longtime director of the church's Riverside Hawks basketball program, who stepped down in 2002 after being accused of sexual abuse. The first suit under this act was brought to trial in January 2026 and was later settled.

== Architecture ==
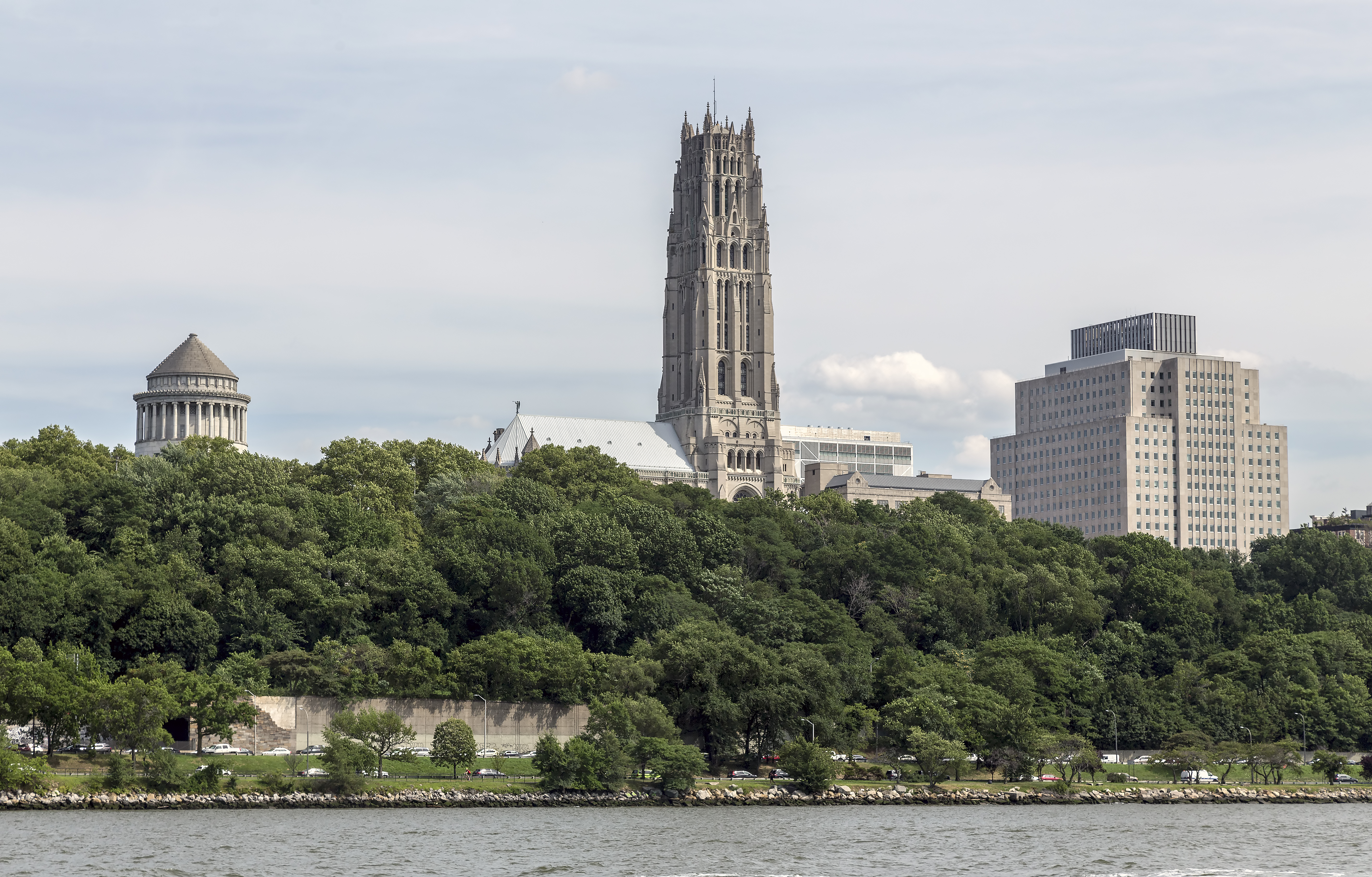
The tower of Riverside Church (center) rises above the tree-line of Riverside Park. Grant's Tomb (left) and the Interchurch Center (right) can also be seen.

Riverside Church occupies a 454-by-100-foot (138 m × 30 m) lot between Riverside Drive to the west, 122nd Street to the north, Claremont Avenue to the east, and 120th Street to the south. Riverside Church's main architects; Henry C. Pelton, Francis R. Allen, and Charles Collens; created the general plan for the church. Pelton was most involved with tactical planning while Collens was most involved with the Gothic detail. Sculptural elements were designed by Robert Garrison and constructed by local studios, including the Piccirilli Brothers. The church's interior was designed by Burnham Hoyt. The Martin Luther King Jr. (MLK) Wing to the south of the original building was designed by Collens, Willis & Beckonert and the Stone Gym to the southeast was designed by Louis E. Jallade. As of 2017, Riverside Church is the tallest church in the United States and is among the world's tallest churches, with a tower rising 392 feet (119 m).

Pelton and Collens chose a Gothic architectural style for Riverside Church's exterior; by contrast, the internal structure incorporates modern curtain walls and a steel frame. Fosdick later said the exterior Gothic style is suited to "make people pray" and that the church had "not outgrown Gothic" in that regard. Riverside Church's design is partially derived from Chartres Cathedral in France but also incorporates designs of several Gothic churches in France and Spain. Pelton and Collens said Chartres would provide the "fundamental principles" for the design of Riverside Church but that Riverside would have a completely different outline. The features inspired by Chartres include the detailing of the three Riverside Drive entrances and the lack of decorative elements on the facade, except for the stained glass windows on the walls and the sculptural elements around each portal. The massive single bell tower was inspired by the two western towers at Chartres. The rest of the facade consists of Indiana Limestone.

Upon Riverside Church's completion, its design received both praise and criticism. In mid-1931, The American Architect published pieces in mid-1931 that featured a critical viewpoint from Columbia architecture professor Walter A. Taylor and a rebuttal from architect Charles Crane, who had worked on the project with Pelton. While Taylor believed the design should have been more modernist, Crane defended Pelton's Gothic design as being "fundamentally Christian". The writers of the 1939 WPA Guide to New York City said the tower's features make the "building itself seem smaller than it is, so that its scale is scarcely impressive, even when seen at close range". Other critics called the building's exterior overly opulent; according to one critic, when considered along with the progressive ideology, the Gothic design "can only be interpreted as an outward confession that religion is dead". The New York Sun referred to the building as one of the "most outstanding additions" to New York City's church architecture "in recent years". Eric Nash, in his book Manhattan Skyscrapers, called Riverside Church "Manhattan's last great eclectic skyscraper" while the AIA Guide to New York City dubbed the church "easily the most prominent architectural work along the Hudson [River] from midtown to the George Washington Bridge".

=== Main building ===
Riverside Church's main structure is centered around the nave, which is aligned on a north–south axis and is closer to Riverside Drive on the western portion of the block. The chapel and narthex are to the south, closer to 120th Street, while the chancel, which contains the altar, and the ambulatory are to the north, closer to 122nd Street.

==== Facade ====
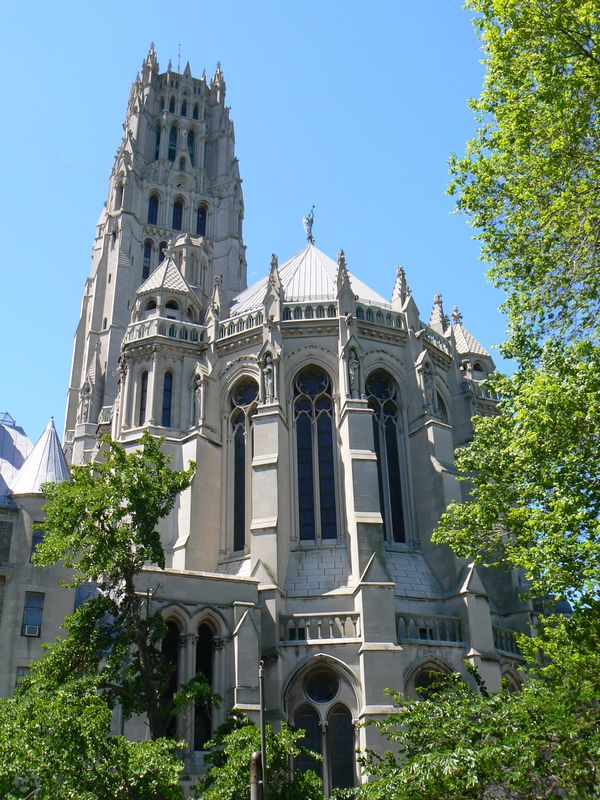
The northern facade of Riverside Church, seen from 122nd Street at the eastern side of the ambulatory

The western facade of the church's nave is adjacent to Riverside Drive. At the time of Riverside Church's construction, the church did not own the lots along 120th Street to the south so the building's three entrances are on its western side facing Riverside Drive rather than on the southern side at the back of the nave, as is customary in most churches. The entrances are atop small flights of steps leading from the street. The building's main entrance faces west and is below the tower's base and is accessed through a set of double wooden doors with recessed wooden panels. The figures sculpted in the concentric archivolts of the doorway represent leading religious, scientific, and philosophical figures, and an elaborate tympanum is below the arches (see § Sculpted elements). To the south is the entrance to the narthex, which is accessed through a single door. Directly south of the narthex entrance, another double-door entrance leads to the chapel; this entrance contains two archivolts and a simpler tympanum. The northern portion of the western facade adjacent to the nave has five sets of windows (see § Nave).

The view of the southern facade is mostly blocked by the MLK Wing to the south. The top portions of four narrow, arched stained-glass windows can be seen above the hip roof of the structure that connects the two sections. Above these stained-glass windows are three recessed, arched windows that are topped by a pediment containing a circular window.

The eastern facade also has five groupings of windows facing the nave but much of this facade is obscured by McGiffert Hall, which faces directly onto Claremont Avenue and 122nd Street. On the eastern facade of the nave is a cloistered passageway leading to Claremont Avenue (see § Cloister passageway). Above the cloister section is a rose window.

The northern facade surrounds the chancel and ambulatory. An arched entrance called the Woman's Porch, which contains carvings of biblical women, is in the western portion of the north facade. Above the entrance arch is an ornate belt course and nearby are two lancet windows. Another entrance is in the eastern (right) portion of the north facade. Between the two entrances is the ambulatory, with two tiers of window groupings, each with a rose window above a pair of lancet windows. The lower section has three sets of windows while the upper clerestory section has five sets of windows. Vertical buttresses, which separate each window grouping, end in finials above the roofline.

==== Nave ====
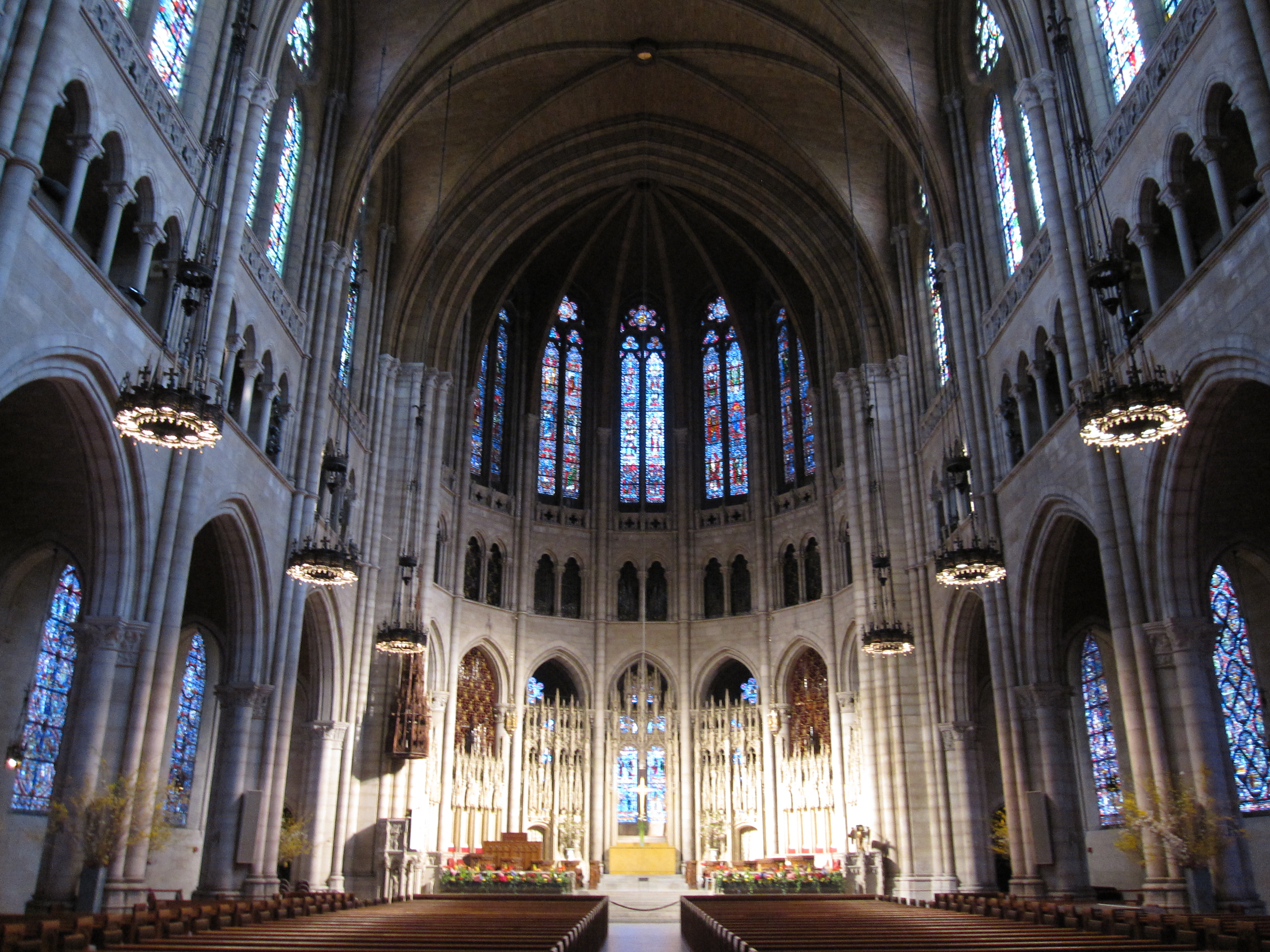
The nave (foreground) looking toward the chancel (background)

The Gothic-themed nave was inspired by Albi Cathedral, France, and measures 100 feet (30 m) high, 89 feet (27 m) wide and 215 feet (66 m) long. The width between the overhanging clerestory walls is 60 feet (18 m). The low, wide form of the nave is inspired by those of southern French and Spanish churches. The nave has a metal roof, whose base is surrounded by a shallow arcade. The nave's interior contains a finish of Indiana limestone, the ceilings of its vaults are lined with Guastavino terracotta tiles, and its floor is made of marble.

Three main vertical sections, which are split by buttresses, comprise the nave's eastern and western walls, each of which has five architectural bays along the portion of the nave adjacent to the aisles; each bay contains a pointed-arch window. Above the stained-glass windows of each bay is a triforium gallery with three colonettes, followed by two adjacent lancet windows in the clerestory, and topped with a rose window. Pointed arches resting on piers that contain engaged columns support each of the clerestory bays and serve as the bases for the ribs under the vaulted ceiling. The engaged columns are surmounted by Corinthian capitals that are decorated with scenes from the Book of Jeremiah. The ceilings of the vaults underneath the triforium galleries are faced with Guastavino tile and contain lighting.

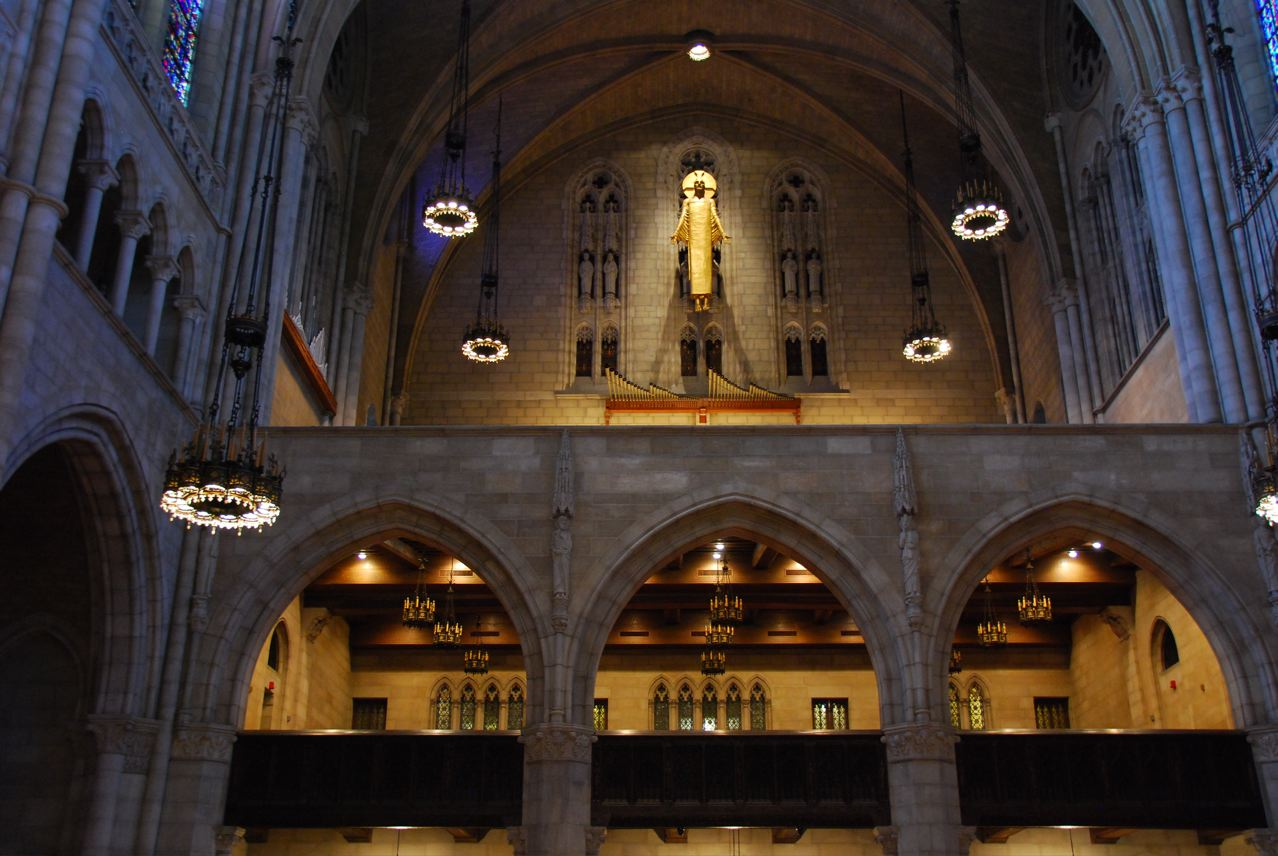
View of the galleries above the nave, looking south. The Trompeta Majestatis organ stop can be seen in the center of the eastern wall, with additional antiphonal pipes at left.

Above the clerestory, the nave's ceiling is eight stories high. It consists of several vaults, each of which is divided into four segments by diagonally interlocking transverse ribs that do not provide structural support. Eight iron lanterns hang from the transverse ribs and descend lower than the level of the triforium gallery. The vaults contain a finish of acoustic Guastavino tiles, which are mostly gray. The tiles above the chancel and the nave's northernmost two bays are brown because a sealant that was applied in 1953 to increase the organ's acoustical reach has turned yellow over time.

The nave was built with a seating capacity of either 2,400, 2,408, or 2,500. The ground level contains 38 rows of oaken pews that have Gothic decoration; five additional rows of pews used to exist at the front of the nave. Two seating galleries overhang the southern portion of the nave. The lower gallery is made of carved wood, has rows of oaken pews on a downward slope, and contains a wooden ceiling with nine lamps. The upper gallery is also made of carved wood and contains oaken pews on a slope but there is no canopy above it. The upper gallery is illuminated with four lanterns that are similar to the eight above the main section of the nave. Behind the southern wall are six double-tiered niches with stone sculptures of ministers and Jacob Epstein's sculpture Christ in Majesty. The Trompeta Majestatis organ stop projects from the wall beneath the niches.

==== Chancel, ambulatory, and apse ====
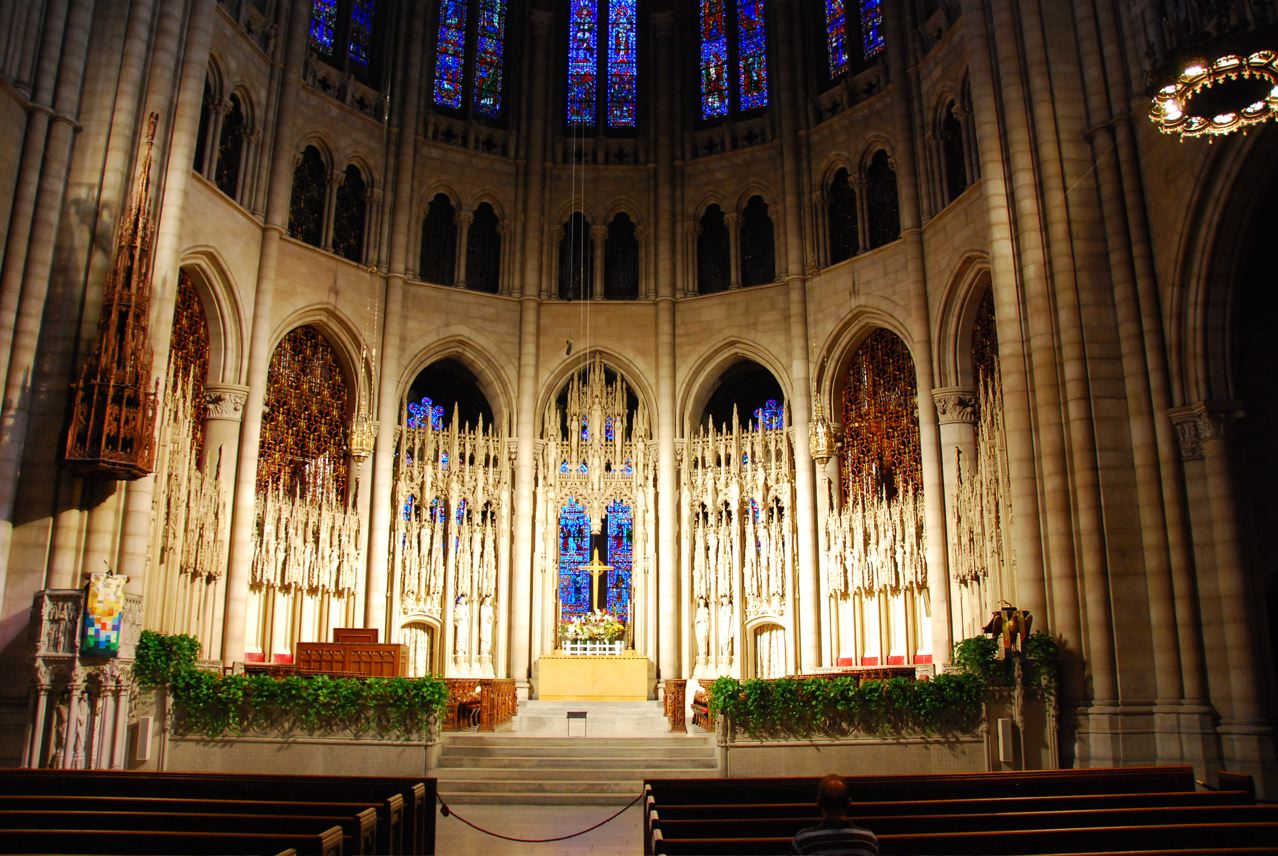
The chancel

The chancel is directly north of the nave, slightly raised above it and separated from the nave by a limestone railing with 20 quatrefoil medallions. The western portion of the rail contains a pulpit with a wooden canopy and three carved limestone blocks. A labyrinth composed of three types of marble; it was inspired by a similar design at Chartres Cathedral and is inlaid in the middle of the chancel floor. The labyrinth is flanked on both sides by four rows of oaken choir stalls with carvings of Psalms texts. To the north, behind the choir stalls, is the organ console. A communion table made of Caen stone is near the back of the chancel in the center, behind which is a baptismal pool.

The back of the chancel contains a convex polygonal wall that includes seven bays, each with three vertical tiers that are a few feet above the corresponding tiers in the nave. The lowest tier contains pointed arches with an elaborate stone chancel screen; the middle tier contains cusped arches with colonettes; and the top tier serves as the clerestory. Each of the three center bays behind the chancel screen has one window group on the lower tier, each of which has two lancet windows topped by a rose window and is divided by vertical buttresses. The apse clerestory, the upper section of the ambulatory, is recessed slightly inward. The upper section's fenestration is similar in form; each window grouping contains a rose window above a pair of lancet windows but the window groupings are on five sides of the polygon. The vertical piers of the chancel wall converge above the clerestory level, creating an apse above the chancel and ambulatory.

==== Narthex ====
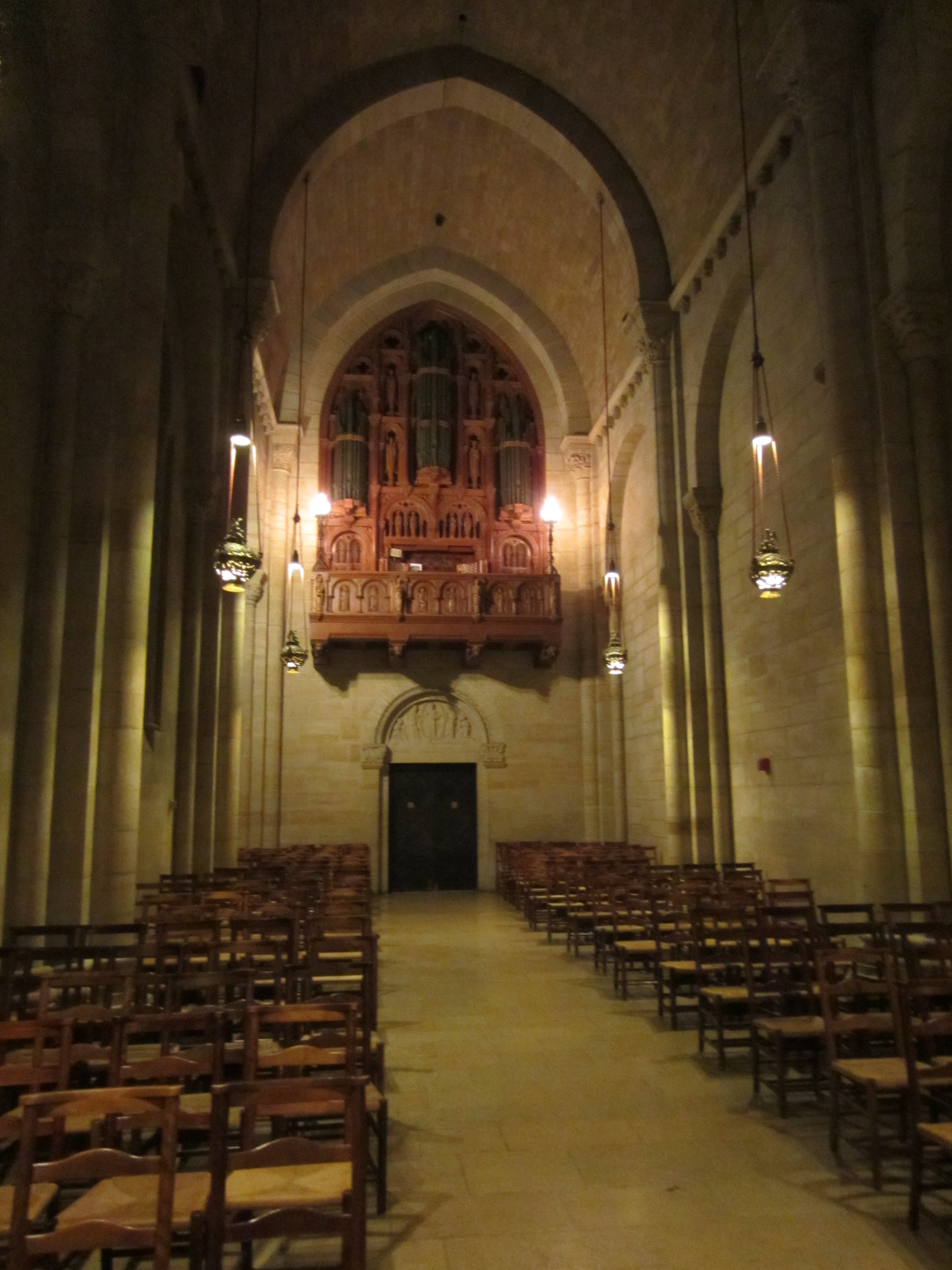
The chapel

The narthex, which was designed in the late Gothic style with a Romanesque layout, is directly south of the nave and can be accessed from the church's West Portal. The narthex is split into four vaults that have Guastavino tiled ceilings that are supported by simple limestone columns. A stone spiral staircase on the west side of the narthex, directly south of the West Portal, leads to the basement. There are two grisaille windows and one rose window on each of the western and eastern sides of the narthex. The eastern wall has four 16th-century lancet windows that were previously in the Park Avenue Baptist Church; they are the only windows in Riverside Church that were not built specifically for the church. Stairs leading both upward and downward are on the eastern side of the narthex, and a mortuary chapel is on the northeastern corner. The mortuary chapel is known as the Gethsemane Chapel but prior to 1959, it was called the Christ Chapel. (Note: There are two chapels that have been known as the Christ Chapel: the mortuary chapel, which was once known as the Christ Chapel, and the main chapel, which was the second to receive the name Christ Chapel.)

==== Chapel ====
The chapel to the south of the narthex, which since 1959 has been known as the Christ Chapel, was inspired by the Basilica of Saints Nazarius and Celsus in France. Its design was inspired by the pointed Romanesque nave at Carcassonne Cathedral. The design, which was described by architectural historian Andrew Dolkart as "earlier than Gothic", is intended to give the impression the rest of the sanctuary was built after the chapel. The chapel is subdivided into four bays and has a barrel-vaulted ceiling with Guastavino tiles, and the walls and floor have a limestone finish. The southern wall, which is adjacent to the MLK Wing, has four arched, back-lit stained-glass windows; one in each bay. Double doors to the west lead to Riverside Drive and a passage to the south leads to the MLK Wing. There are engaged columns on the north and south walls between each of the four bays, and eight lanterns hang from the columns.

The eastern end of the chapel contains an altar, four steps above the chapel's main level. There is a lectern to the right of the altar and a pulpit to the left. Several sculpted representations are above the altar. Behind the altar are a baptismal pool and a reredos, which are accessed through an arched opening. An alcove to the narthex is north of the altar.

=== Tower and carillon ===
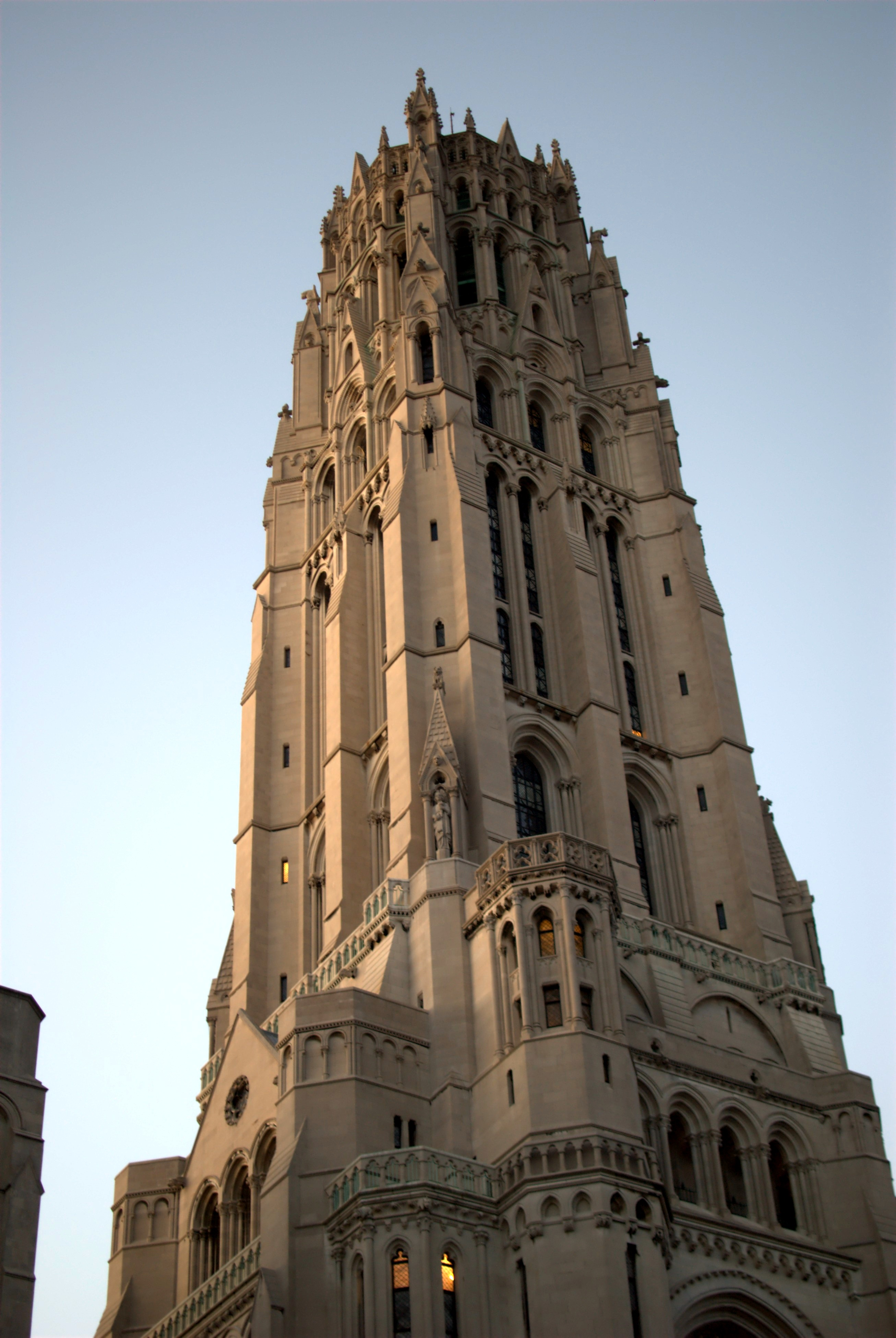
The bell tower, seen from the east

The 392-foot (119 m) tower was named after Laura Spelman Rockefeller, the mother of John D. Rockefeller Jr. The tower contains 21 usable floors, which include 80 classrooms and office rooms. There are four elevators, of which two rise only to the 10th floor, whereas the other two rise to the 20th floor. The 20-floor elevators, which rise 355 feet (108 m), were described in 1999 as the world's tallest elevators inside a church. Two staircases ascend from ground level; one on the western side of the tower ends at the ninth floor, and the one on the eastern side continues to the carillon. Balconies are at the southern corners on the 8th floor and on all sides of the 10th floor except the north side.

The tower's main entrance is on the western elevation of the tower's base and is flanked by projecting vertical piers (see § Facade). Seven arched niches, each containing one statue of a king, are above the main entrance. A large rose window is above the statuary grouping. The apex of the tower is fitted with aircraft warning lights. Above the tenth floor are five tiers of window arrangements on each floor; the higher tiers become progressively narrower. From bottom to top, the successive tiers have two, three, four, and five windows on each side. There are narrow, canopied niches in each corner of the tower, with one statue inside each niche. At the top of the tower is a conical metal roof.

==== Tower stories ====
Most of the tower's stories have plaster floors, steel doors, steel window frames, and iron lighting fixtures hanging from each ceiling. There are elevator lobbies with vaulted ceilings on several stories of the tower. On the stories that contain common spaces, including the ninth and tenth floors, the floors are finished with stone, terrazzo, and wood, and are fitted with wooden doors. Several spaces in the tower have been used by outside entities, who carpeted floors and installed lighting fixtures in some office rooms.

Originally, the fourth through fourteenth floors were occupied by Riverside Church's school while the fifteenth floor and above contained staff and clergy offices, as well as spaces for group activities. The second floor connects to the nave's lower seating gallery, while the third floor leads to the upper seating gallery. The fourth through eighth floors are below the height of the nave's ceiling; these housed the nursery, junior high, and high school departments of the church's school. The ninth and tenth floors housed the double-story school kitchen, school offices, and storage rooms over the nave. The ninth floor also houses a library, and there is wooden furniture in the kitchen and library. The main structure's roof is above the tenth floor, and the tower rises independently above that point. The eleventh through fourteenth floors originally contained the church's elementary school while the fifteenth and sixteenth floors respectively housed the young people's meeting room and the social room. These floors were later converted into office space, and several floors were subdivided and leased out. The seventeenth through twentieth floors include meeting rooms and the seventeenth floor also contains offices. The twenty-first floor includes the carilloneur's studio and the twenty-second floor is devoted to mechanical space.

==== Carillon ====
The 23rd floor of the tower contains a three-level belfry that houses a carillon whose final complement of 74 bronze bells, which at the time of its construction the largest carillon of bells in the world, includes the 20-ton, 122-inch-diameter (3.1 m) bourdon, the world's largest tuned bell. Though other carillons with more bells have been commissioned, (Note: The carillon at Hyechon College in Daejeon, South Korea, contains 78 bells. Kirk in the Hills in Bloomfield Township, Oakland County, Michigan, contains 77 bells.) Riverside Church's carillon is still the largest in the world by aggregate weight: the bells and associated mechanisms weigh a combined 500,000 pounds (230,000 kg). The bells themselves are cited as weighing approximately 100 short tons (89 long tons; 91 t) or over 100 short tons. Of the carillon's bells, 53 were made for the original Park Avenue church by English founders Gillett & Johnston and another 19 were made for Riverside Church when it opened. Two bells were added in 1955 and 58 treble bells were replaced by bell founders Van Bergen. The bells were replaced again by Whitechapel Bell Foundry in 2004. The bells can reportedly be heard from up to 8 miles (13 km) from the tower. The bourdon sounds one octave lower than other bourdons.

A mechanical power room and control room are in the belfry, with the clavier cabin at the top, above the carillon. Due to the weight of the carillon, the heaviest steel beams used in the construction of Riverside Church were used in the tower. The north facade, which overhangs the nave, is supported by a single cross truss that weighs 60 short tons (54 long tons; 54 t). Outside the carillon, the tower's facade has ornate Neo-Gothic detailing that includes features such as gargoyles. On top of the carillon is a public observation deck; the deck was closed after the September 11, 2001, attacks due to security concerns but the church resumed tours in January 2020.

=== Cloister passageway ===
The cloister passageway leads from the southern portion of the nave to Claremont Avenue in the east. It has four pointed-arch bays, each with a Corinthian-style colonette topped by a grisaille window opening on the south wall. The north and south walls also contain stained-glass windows; the northern wall's windows are artificially illuminated. Inside the cloister passageway are five vaults, which are illuminated by six lanterns. The entrance to the passageway is a small, two-story structure with two arched doorways facing Claremont Avenue and a set of double doors facing a short wheelchair ramp to the south. The top of the cloister entrance's eastern facade contains three niches with figures of Faith, Hope, and Charity, and the southeastern corner contains a figure of Maaseiah. A gift shop is adjacent to the cloister passageway, and sculptures of the church's architects and builder are above the doorway leading to the tower's base.

=== Martin Luther King Jr. Wing ===
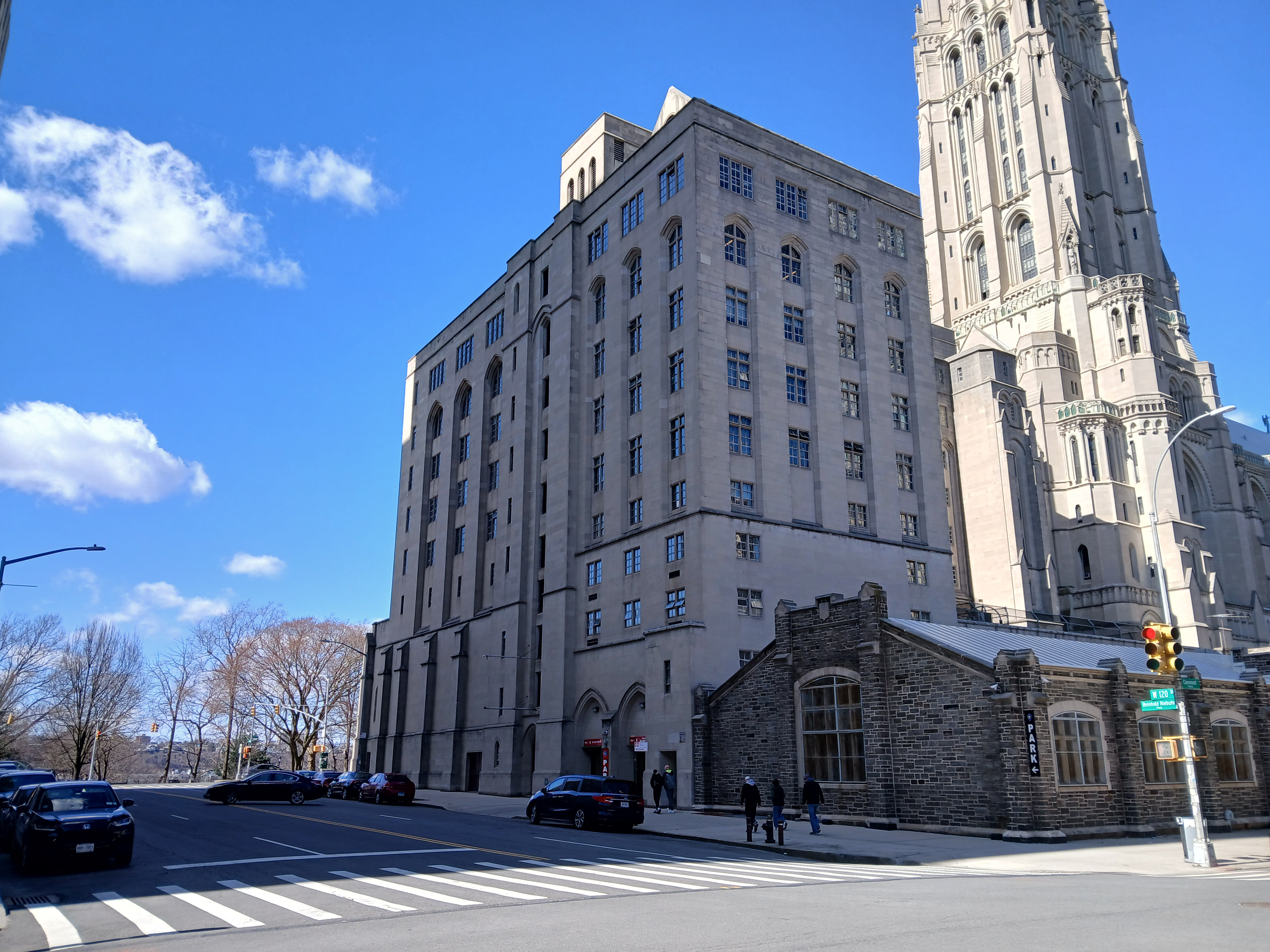
The MLK Wing as seen from Claremont Avenue and 120th Street

The Martin Luther King Jr. (MLK) Wing is a seven-story annex south of the main structure and facing 120th Street along the southern boundary of the plot. The long arm of this L-shaped building lies north–south adjacent to Riverside Drive and the short arm lies west–east next to 120th Street. The MLK Wing connects to the original church building to the north and the Stone Gym to the east. The area between the MLK Wing and the cloister forms a small courtyard or garth, which is enclosed on the eastern side by a metal fence. Inside the wing are children's chapels, space for the school, a rooftop recreation area, space for a radio station, community areas including a gymnasium and assembly room, and a basement with a parking lot.

The structure, which was designed by Collens, Willis and Beckonert, and built by Vermilea-Brown, is a simplified version of Allen and Collens' original church design and was perceived as being "modern Gothic". The building was known as the South Wing until 1985, when it was renamed for civil rights leader Martin Luther King Jr.

==== Facade ====
The facade is clad with Indiana limestone, the foundation is made of stone and concrete, and the structure is supported by a steel frame. The main entrance is through the chapel doors on Riverside Drive to the west; there are also entrances to the basement from 120th Street. The basement, first and second floors of the western facade contains eight architectural bays, each with one small lancet window, which are recessed between projecting buttresses and below a set of arches. The two outermost bays project slightly outward and do not contain recessed arches. The section of the MLK Wing above the second floor is set back from Riverside Drive, and the windows on the third, fourth, fifth, and sixth floors are also recessed between buttressed arches. The seventh-floor windows are flush with the buttresses. The two outermost bays have two sets of windows rather than a single window on each floor, and project slightly outward.

The wing's southern and eastern facades are designed in a similar fashion to the upper portion of the western facade; the seventh-floor windows are flush with the buttresses while the windows below are in recessed arched bays. The southern facade contains eight window bays, six of which are recessed. There are no windows into the first and second floors on the westernmost four bays of the southern facade but the eastern four bays do have windows into these floors. On the far eastern portion of the southern facade are two pointed-arched openings that lead to the church's underground parking garage (see § Basement). The eastern facade is separated into two sections; the section at the end of the wing's short arm contains four recessed window bays. The section next to the north–south axis of the "L" contains six window bays, four of which are recessed.

==== Interior ====
The northern arm of the MLK Wing's first floor includes the South Hall Lobby, which has a two-story-high coffered ceiling that is supported by a pointed-arch arcade and its walls are made of gray plaster. To the south of the lobby lie an elevator bank and an auditorium called the South Hall. The South Hall's walls are made of wood paneling below limestone and it has nine stained-glass lancet windows on the western side. To the east of the auditorium are two mezzanine levels that lie below the South Hall's ceiling, while a sealed tunnel leading to the Interchurch Center across 120th Street is also accessible from the auditorium.

The third-to-seventh floors include classrooms, except for the fifth floor, which contains offices. The hallway floors are made of terrazzo and individual rooms have resilient flooring, except for the fifth floor rooms, which contain carpeted rooms, and each level has dropped ceilings. Chapels for children are on the third floor's southwestern corner and on the sixth floor's southern side. The roof contains a solarium and a play area.

=== Stone Gym ===
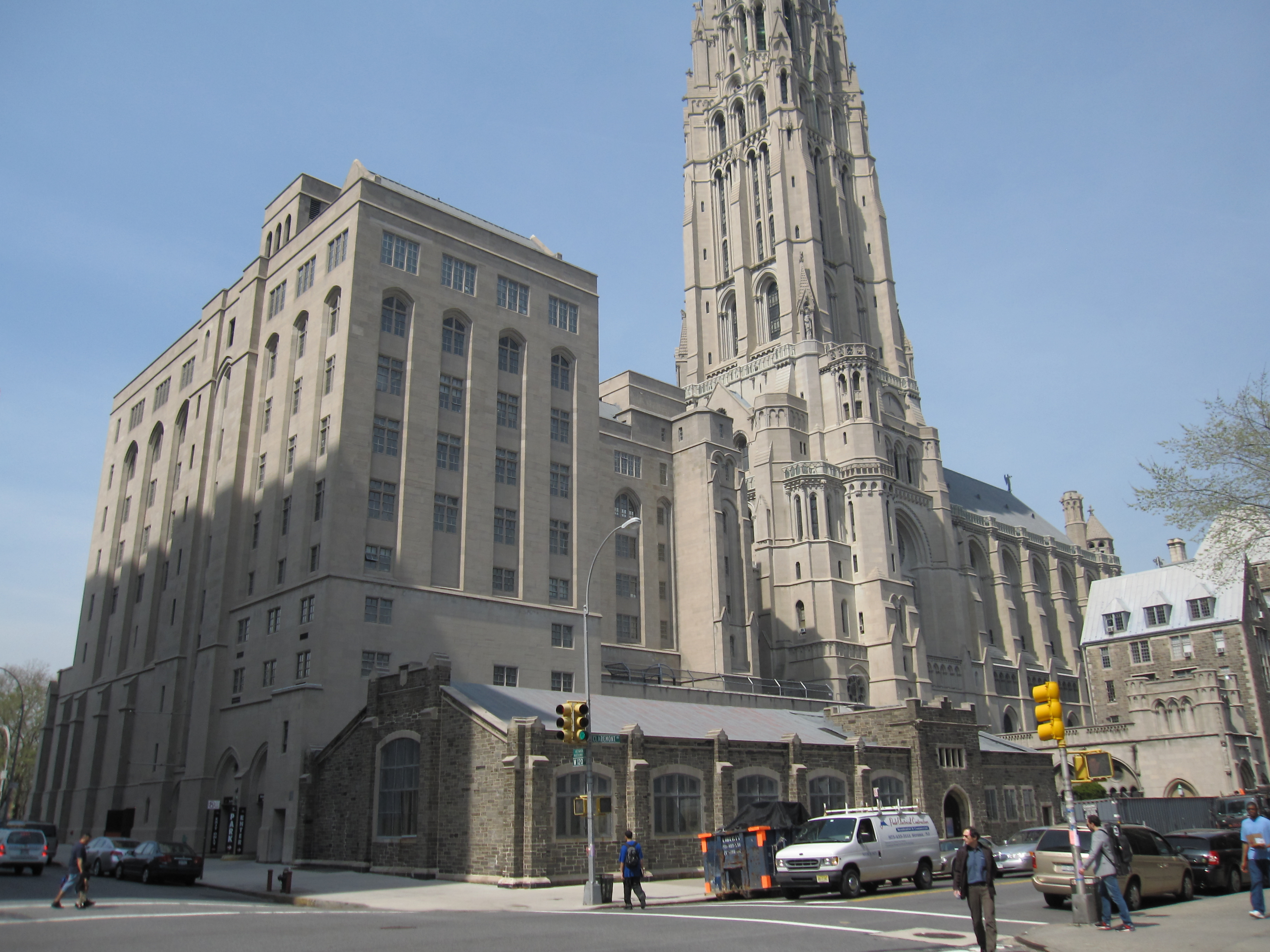
Stone Gym (center), MLK Wing (left), and tower (center-right)

The Stone Gymnasium is a 1 1/2-story English Gothic building at 120th Street and Claremont Avenue, east of the Martin Luther King Jr. Wing. The gym was built in 1912 to a design by Louis E. Jallade and was originally used by the Union Theological Seminary. Its architectural details include a facade of schist with limestone decoration and a metal hip roof. The structure measures five bays long on the eastern facade and one bay wide on the southern and northern facades. In 1957, Rockefeller donated the building to the church and five years later, it reopened as a gymnasium and community facility. The building's interior contains a basketball court with synthetic flooring, and there are offices and lockers in its northern end.

=== Basement ===
Riverside Church's basement includes several modern amenities such as a 250-seat movie theater and a gymnasium with a full-size basketball court. The section of the basement under the nave has a double-height ceiling; an assembly hall is on the southern side of this space while the gymnasium is on the northern side. The assembly hall has a stone floor and walls, and there are six arched stained-glass windows on the eastern wall and one rectangular stained glass window on the south wall, as well as cabinets that contain two Heinrich Hofmann paintings (see § Paintings). It also has a wooden ceiling that is supported by stone arches, with lanterns suspended from the ceiling and a stage in the northern portion. A kitchen is east of the stage, and a corridor runs adjacent to the western wall of the assembly room and gymnasium.

The basement originally included a four-lane bowling alley that was adjacent to the assembly floor. It was later removed and converted into storage space. There is a two-story, 150-space parking garage underneath the MLK Wing.

== Organs ==
The two Riverside Church organs are located in the chancel and the seating gallery. The chancel organ was the 14th largest in the world in 2017. It was furnished in 1930 by Hook and Hastings, and was originally criticized as mediocre. Aeolian-Skinner built an organ console in the chancel in 1948 and replaced the chancel organ in 1953–1954, under the direction of Virgil Fox. Fox based his design on his changing tastes for organ specifications, and thus, it is reported that at times, he was changing his mind every other day to the point that by the time that the almost 200 rank organ was finished, Aeolian Skinner reported that they had lost $15,000 on the project. When the organ was finished, the ceiling above the chancel and the front of the nave was also coated with sealant to improve the acoustic qualities of the chancel. The chancel organ was opened with a concert in March 1955 with a concert by Virgil Fox and the New York Philharmonic Symphony Orchestra, attended by 3000 people.

In 1964, another Aeolian-Skinner organ was installed within the eastern wall of the nave's seating gallery; three years later, Anthony A. Bufano installed a five-manual console for the gallery organ. The gala concert celebrating the opening of this console included a work for two organs Signs in the Sun commissioned for the event from Daniel Pinkham. M. P. Moller built another stop for the gallery organ, the Trompeta Majestatis, in 1978. Two years later, the chancel organ received a new principal chorus with the addition of the Grand Chorus division. In the 1990s, the console was rewired, the chancel organ was cleaned, and the ceiling was covered with ten layers of sealant.

The Director of Music and organist is Nathaniel Gumbs as of 2025. Past organists at the Riverside Church include Virgil Fox (1946–1965), Frederick Swann (1957–1982), John Walker (1979–1992), Timothy Smith (1992–2008), Christopher Johnson (2009–2021), and Christopher Creaghan (2021-2023).

== Art and sculpture ==
=== Paintings ===
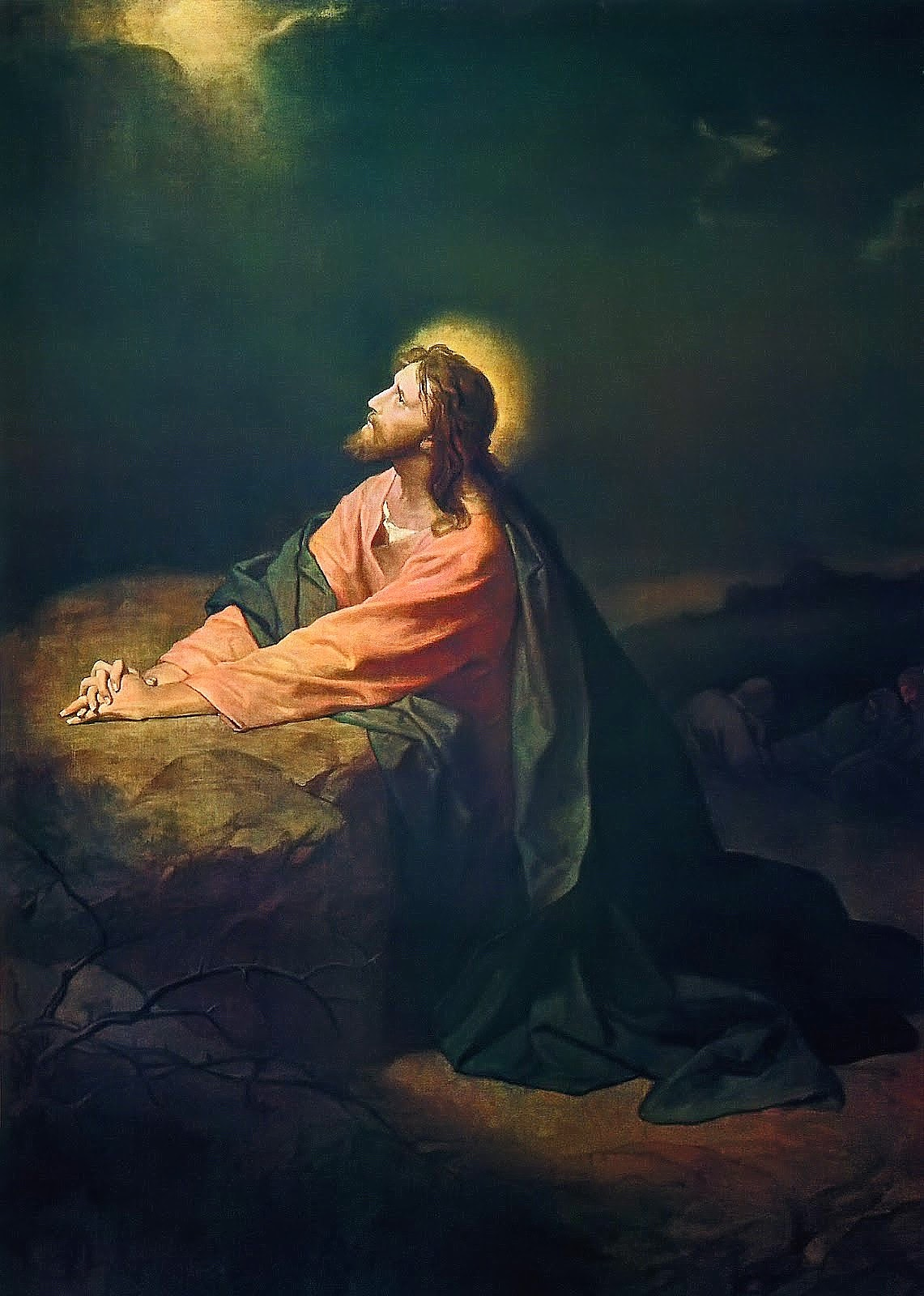
Heinrich Hofmann, Christ in Gethsemane, 1886

Paintings by Heinrich Hofmann that were purchased by Rockefeller Jr. and donated to the church in November 1930 are displayed in the building. Christ in the Temple (1871) and Christ and the Young Rich Ruler (1889) are displayed in the assembly hall beneath the nave, and are usually locked within the cabinets there. Hofmann's Christ in Gethsemane (1890) is displayed the Gethsemane chapel.

=== Stained glass ===
Riverside Church's main building contains 51 stained glass windows, excluding small grisaille windows. These were created in a mosaic style, which was becoming more popular at the time of the church's construction. Of these, 34 windows are in the nave; most of them include religious iconography. Generally, the richly colored windows are on the building's western side, which is considered the "light" side, while those with muted colors are on the eastern "dark" side.

French glassmakers Jacques Simon from Reims Cathedral and Charles Lorin from Chartres Cathedral were hired to create the glass for the clerestory windows in the nave. Lorin designed the stained-glass windows on the western side of the clerestory while Simon designed those on the eastern side. Both sets of windows depict general religious and governmental themes, and also incorporate secular iconography and depictions of non-Christians. The clerestory windows closely resemble those at Chartres and include a rose with lancet windows. The other windows in the nave were created by Boston-based firm Reynolds, Francis and Rohnstock and depict 138 scenes with both religious and non-religious contexts. The three groups of stained glass windows in the apse and the nine stained glass windows in the South Hall were created by Harry Wright Goodhue.

=== Mosaics ===
Gregor T. Goethals created two mosaics for the fourth and seventh floors of the MLK Wing. The fourth-floor mosaic depicts events described in the Old Testament while the seventh-floor mosaic depicts the Creation story.

=== Sculpted elements ===
==== Exterior elements ====
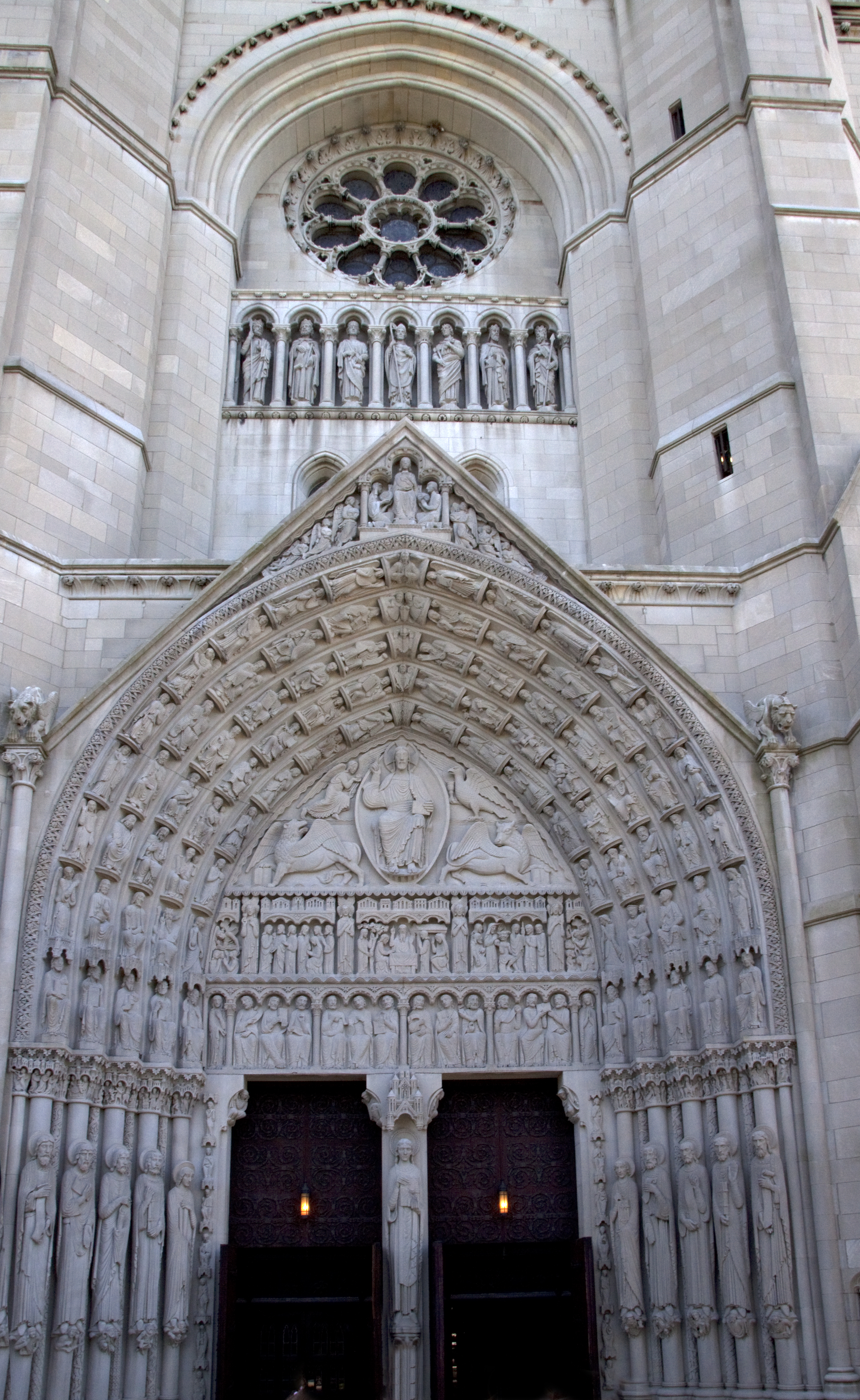
Front doorway at the base of the tower. At the bottom are archivolts (directly under the arch), tympanum, and jambs (bottom, to either side of the doors). At the top is the circular rose window, and niches with the sculptures of seven kings.

The building's most prominent sculptural details are on the Riverside Drive facade. The main entrance beneath the tower is topped with five concentric archivolts with sculptures of Jesus's followers and prophets inlaid within each section. The third arch of the main entrance has depictions of philosophers including Ralph Waldo Emerson, Immanuel Kant, and Pythagoras, while the second arch depicts scientists including Albert Einstein, Charles Darwin, and Hippocrates. Other figures depict the months of the year. The columns framing the door jambs beneath the archivolts are decorated with capitals and gargoyles at the top and bottom, and a single figure in the middle. In the tympanum above the doors and below the archivolts is a figure of Christ seated, which is flanked by the symbols of the Evangelists.

When Riverside Church was completed, there was controversy over the inclusion of Einstein, a living Jewish man, because the other figures represented people who had since died. According to the publication Church Monthly, during construction, the committee tasked with the church's iconography had proposed depicting 20 scientists, not including Einstein, on the facade. The faculty, however, unanimously decided Einstein should be included because he was indisputably one of 14 "leading scientists of all time".

The chapel entrance on Riverside Drive south of the main entrance contains two archivolts that are supported by two sets of columns. The archivolts depict symbols of the zodiac and the second archivolt contains an elaborate decorative molding. A tympanum relief below the archivolts depicts the Virgin Mary flanked by two angels who are mirror images of each other.

Sculpted elements are also placed within niches that are spread across the church's facade. Above the main entrance on the western facade are sculptures of seven kings. Statues are also included in the tower's niches, as well as in niches on the facade of the cloister entrance to the east. The facade also has gargoyles, which are outside the carillon near the top of the tower. The northern section of the nave's roof contains Angel of the Resurrection, a bronze statue of a trumpeter atop a pedestal.

==== Interior elements ====
The carvings inside the church correspond to the respective uses of the areas in which they are sited. For instance, the 20 quatrefoil medallions inscribed on the chancel railing depict the typical "interests, emphases, activities, rites, and ceremonies" that are conducted within the chancel. Around the pulpit are sculptures of ten Old Testament prophets. Above the nave, the southern wall of the upper seating gallery contains multi-tiered niches, whose upper tiers contain sculpted figures of ministers. The two central niches contain a cast of Epstein's gilded-plaster sculpture Christ in Majesty.

There seven-paneled chancel screen at the back of the chancel is carved from Caen stone. It depicts influential figures including the composer Johann Sebastian Bach, the U.S. president Abraham Lincoln, the artist Michelangelo, the social reformer Florence Nightingale, and the author Booker T. Washington. The panels depict physicians, teachers, prophets, humanitarians, missionaries, reformers, and lovers of beauty.

Above the doorway between the cloister and the tower base are statues of architects Henry Pelton and Charles Collens, as well as general contractor Robert Eidlitz.

Carving details

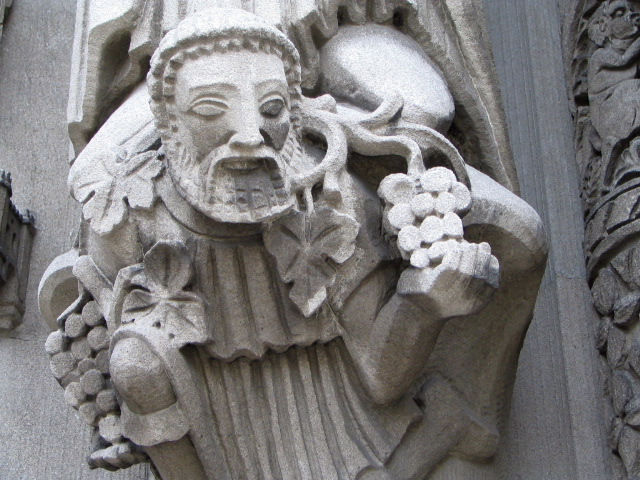
Stone carving detail

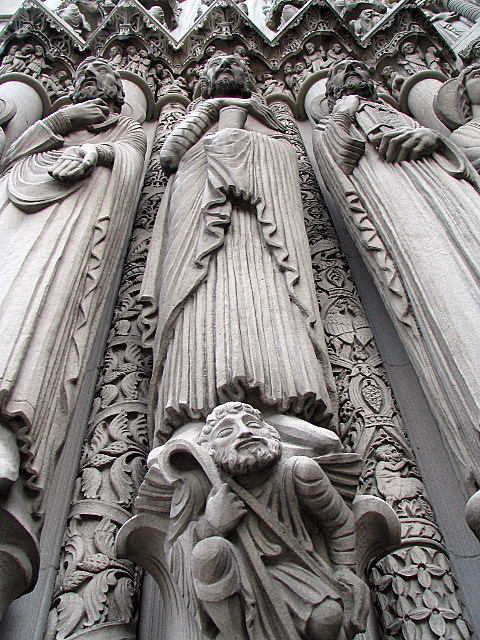
Several sculptures like these adorn the church

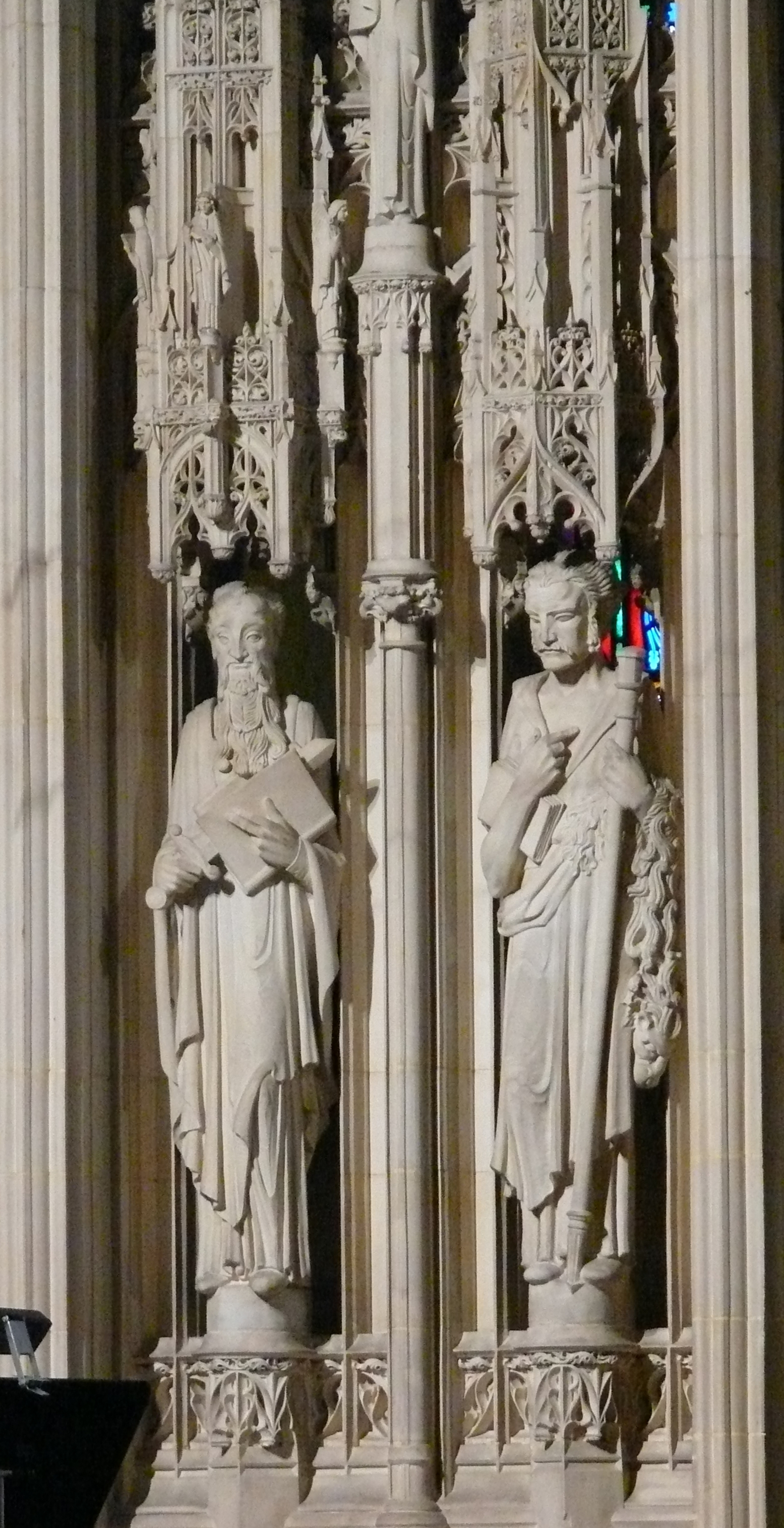
Sculpted figures inside the gallery

=== Sculpture ===
When the Martin Luther King Jr. Wing was built, Jacob Epstein's sculpture Madonna and Child, which was commissioned in 1927, was placed in the courtyard between the MLK Wing and the cloistered entrance.

== Beliefs ==
=== Marriage ===
The church has an inclusive vision and celebrates both opposite-sex marriages and same-sex marriages.

== Social services ==
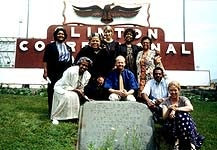
Volunteers from the Riverside Church Prison Ministry

Riverside Church was conceived as a complex social-services center from the outset; the building has meeting rooms, classrooms, a daycare center, a kindergarten, library, auditorium, and a gymnasium. It was described by The New York Times in 2008 as "a stronghold of activism and political debate throughout its 75-year history ... influential on the nation's religious and political landscapes". Riverside Church provides various social services, including a food bank, barber training, clothing distribution, a shower project, and confidential HIV tests and HIV counseling. In 2007, The New York Times said Riverside Church has frequently "been likened to the Vatican for America's mainstream Protestants".

=== Social justice ministries ===
==== Charity and shelter ====
Riverside Church's prisoner-related ministries, Riverside's Prison Ministry and Family Advocacy Program, conduct worship services in the New York State Department of Corrections and Community Supervision, help prisoners and their families, links prisoners to their communities, workshops, support groups, and events, and lobby for prison reform and humane legislation.

Riverside's Coming Home ministry, which was founded in 1985, helps ex-prisoners after they have been released. The prison ministries began in 1971, when the Council on Christian Social Relations created a prison reform and rehabilitation task force. It also deals with homelessness in New York City. Riverside's advocacy of the homeless originated from a similar ministry, the Clothing Room and Food Pantry, which was a subdivision of the Social Services Department. The church began sheltering homeless people overnight from 1984 until 1994, when it was closed due to the decreasing homeless population and a staff shortage.

Riverside participated in the Sanctuary movement during the 1980s, and was among numerous congregations nationwide that sheltered and assisted undocumented immigrants. As part of the New Sanctuary Coalition, volunteers at Riverside Church assist detained asylum seekers and those on parole from immigration detention. In 2011, as part of the Occupy Faith movement, Riverside Church donated tents to Occupy Wall Street protesters and sheltered them during cold and inclement weather, and after the evacuation of Zuccotti Park.

==== Social and cultural ====
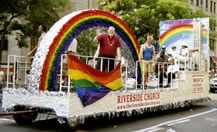
Riverside's Pride Parade Float

Riverside Church's LGBT ministry is named Maranatha. It was founded in 1978 in response to growing demand from gay and lesbian congregants. Maranatha hosts several activities, workshops, and events, and marches annually in the NYC Pride March. In the 1980s, when the HIV/AIDS epidemic in New York City was at its peak, there was a backlash against Maranatha because the LGBT community was negatively associated with the epidemic. These events led to the founding of the separate HIV/AIDS ministry, which hosts a support forum, provides testing, counseling, and referral programs, and collaborates with several other programs.. Riverside Church's African Fellowship and Ministry sponsors educational forums about issues facing Africa, advocates on behalf of African diasporas with an active Facebook page. The Sharing and Densford Funds advocate on behalf of Native Americans in the United States. Other ministries at Riverside include support groups for South Africans, and for Hispanic and Latino Americans.

==== Other activism ====
Riverside Church has several other social justice ministries.

Palestine Circle is a fellowship of Riverside congregants and allies formed in 2025 that focuses on Palestinian liberation and a lasting peace in the region, and that organizes education, advocacy, and public events.

The environmentalist Beloved Earth ministry has a focus on climate change activism.

The Wellbotics ministry helps the families of cancer patients.

The church also has several pacifist task forces, including the Anti-Death Penalty Task Force and the "Overcoming Violence" task force, which is dedicated to fostering dialogue with the New York City Police Department.

Riverside Church also participates in the National Religious Campaign Against Torture.

=== Former programming ===
When it was completed in 1959, Riverside Church's MLK Wing included space for a radio station that was planned by the church. The Federal Communications Commission (FCC) granted the church an FM broadcasting license in 1960, and the following year, the church started operating the radio station WRVR (later WKHK, now WLTW), which broadcast on 106.7 MHz. WRVR originally broadcast from the church's carillon but was relocated to the Empire State Building in 1971 to increase the range of its broadcast signal. WRVR, which was originally a noncommercial station, broadcast sermons and programming from cultural and higher-education institutions in New York City. WRVR incurred an annual net loss for Riverside Church and in 1971, it was turned into a "limited commercial operation", which also failed to pay for itself. The church decided to sell its radio station in 1975, and the sale was finalized the following year.

Starting in November 1976, Riverside Church hosted the Riverside Dance Festival, which was a continuation of previous dance ministries hosted by the church and normally offered 34 weeks of programming from over 60 dance companies. The program ended in June 1987 because of a $900,000 funding shortfall.

A link to 106.7 FM's days as Riverside Church-owned WRVR remains on WLTW in the present day. A recorded sermon from Riverside Church airs on the station from 5:00 to 6:00 a.m. on Sunday mornings, as part of WLTW's non-music public affairs programming.

== Called senior ministers ==
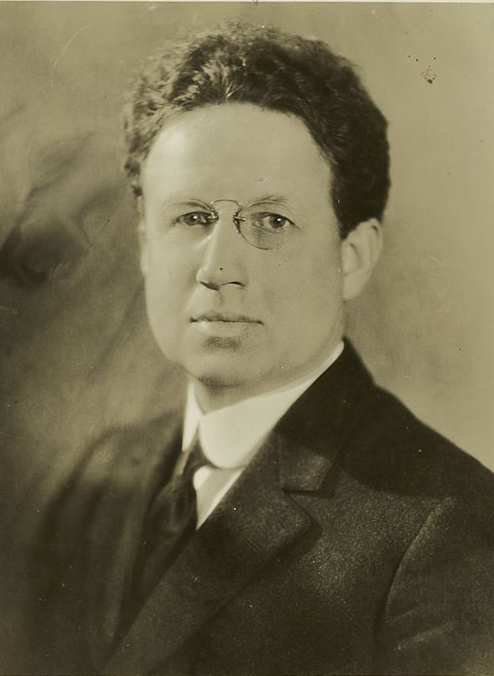
Harry Emerson Fosdick

While Riverside Church is interdenominational, it is associated with the American Baptist Churches USA and the United Church of Christ. In chronological order, the called senior ministers at Riverside Church have been:

Called senior minister	Start date	End date	Notes
Harry Emerson Fosdick	1925	1945	
Robert J. McCracken	1946	1967	
Ernest T. Campbell	1968	1976	
William Sloane Coffin	1977	1987	
James A. Forbes	1989	2007	
Brad R. Braxton	2008	2009	
Amy Butler	2014	2019	
Adriene Thorne	2022	present	

== Notable speakers ==
On April 4, 1967, a year before his assassination, Martin Luther King Jr. gave a speech called Beyond Vietnam: A Time to Break Silence, in which he voiced his opposition to the Vietnam War, at Riverside Church. The Rev. Jesse Jackson gave the eulogy at Jackie Robinson's funeral service in 1972. In 1991, Nelson Mandela, anti-apartheid activist and later South African president, spoke at Riverside following his release from prison. Secretary-General of the United Nations Kofi Annan spoke there after the September 11, 2001 attacks, and former U.S. president Bill Clinton spoke at the church in 2004.

Speakers at Riverside Church have also included theologians Paul Tillich, who taught nearby, and Reinhold Niebuhr; civil-rights activists Cesar Chavez and Desmond Tutu; Cuban president Fidel Castro; the 14th Dalai Lama; and Abdullah II of Jordan. On March 23, 2026, Democracy Now! held their 30th anniversary event at Riverside Church where Bruce Springsteen, Patti Smith, Michael Stipe, and others performed.

== See also ==
- List of Baptist churches
- List of carillons in the United States
- List of New York City Designated Landmarks in Manhattan above 110th Street
- National Register of Historic Places listings in Manhattan above 110th Street
