= Ernest T. Campbell =

American Protestant minister and writer

- Born: August 14, 1923; New York City, U.S.
- Died: July 9, 2010 (aged 86); New York City, U.S.
- Education: AB, Bob Jones University; B.Div. (1948) and Th.M. (1949), Princeton Theological Seminary; Litt.D. (hon.), Grove City College; DDiv. (hon.), Westminster College (Pennsylvania), 1958
- Occupation: Protestant Christian minister
- Spouse(s): Frances E. Parker; Joan P. Walsh
- Parent(s): William and Carolyn Campbell

Ecclesiastical career
- Church: Presbyterian Church (USA)
- Ordained: 1949
- Writings: The Christian Manifesto; Where Cross the Crowded Ways; Locked in a Room with Open Doors
- Congregations: First Presbyterian Church, Stroudsburg, Pennsylvania, 1949–1954; First Presbyterian Church, York, Pennsylvania, 1954–1962; First Presbyterian Church, Ann Arbor, Michigan, 1962–1968; Riverside Church, New York City, 1968–1976

Ernest Thomas Campbell (August 14, 1923 – July 9, 2010) was an American Presbyterian clergyman, theologian, and writer. He is most remembered as senior minister of New York City's prominent Riverside Church from 1968 to 1976. A native of New York City, Campbell previously served as minister at churches in Pennsylvania and the First Presbyterian Church of Ann Arbor, Michigan. After resigning from Riverside Church, he lectured at various seminaries including his alma mater, Princeton Theological Seminary, and was Professor of Homiletics at Garrett–Evangelical Theological Seminary between 1982 and 1989.

== Early years and education ==
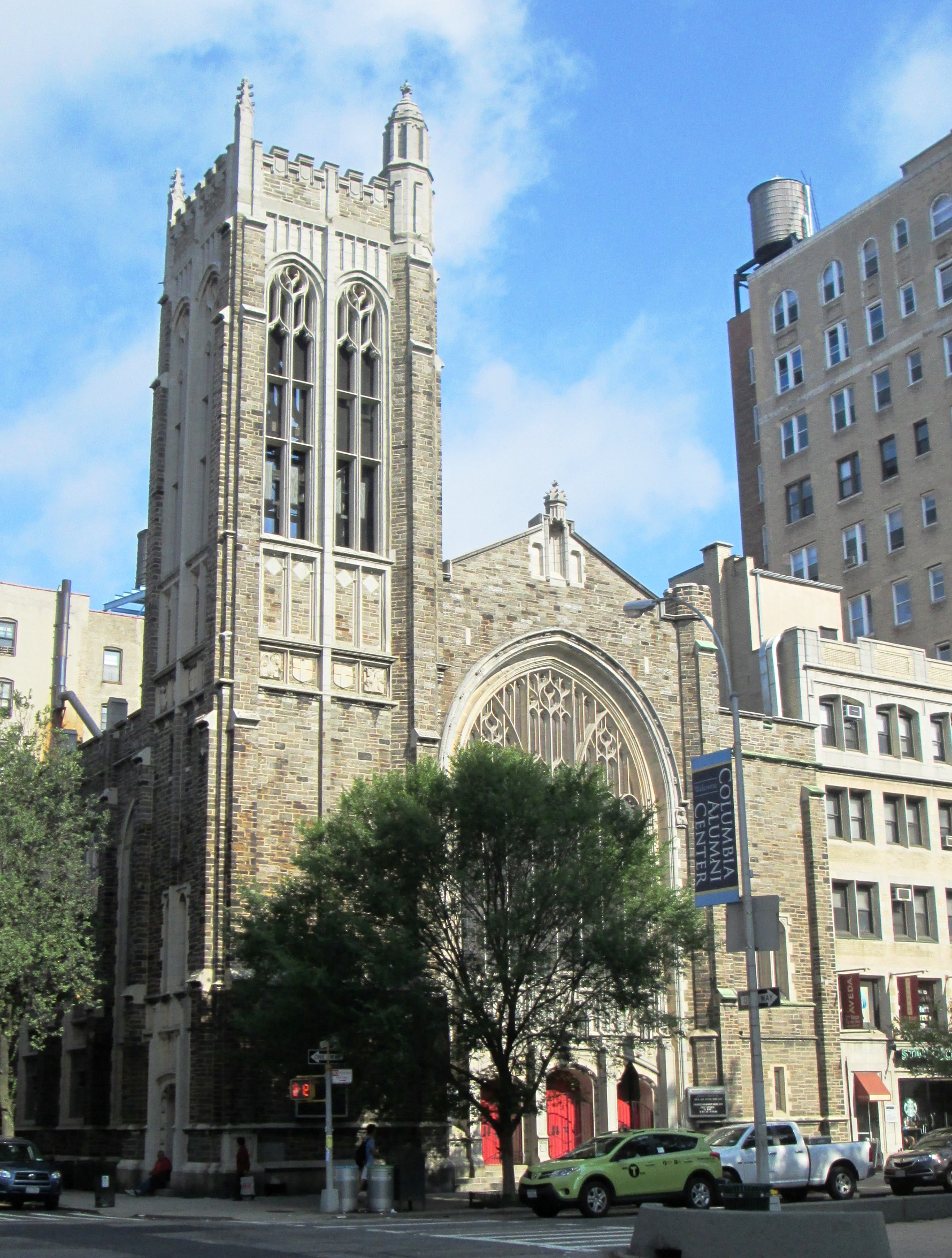
Broadway Presbyterian Church, where Campbell was confirmed as a youth

Campbell was born in New York City, the son of working class Irish immigrants William and Carolyn Campbell, and lived in the Morningside Heights neighborhood. His father worked as a streetcar operator on the Third Avenue Railway. While in his teens, Campbell was confirmed at nearby Broadway Presbyterian Church. He attended public schools in New York as a boy and enjoyed playing baseball and basketball at Riverside Park. Interested at first in a banking career, Campbell graduated from the old High School of Commerce and then studied finance in night school at New York University while working at Guaranty Trust bank. He made several trips playing the piano with the Young Collegians musical ensemble from Broadway Presbyterian Church and felt "strangely fulfilled" when asked to give his testimony one night, he later recounted in an interview, and also served as a leader at the Bowery Mission.

Campbell soon found that he aspired to the ministry, deciding to attend Bob Jones University because it was the only school his parents could afford and he was impressed by Bob Jones Jr., after hearing the son of the school's namesake preach at Broadway Presbyterian Church. While at Bob Jones University, where he gained a thorough knowledge of the Bible, Campbell preached as a ministerial student at Central Presbyterian Church in Anniston, Alabama, in 1944 and 1945. After graduation from the conservative school with a Bachelor of Arts (A.B.) degree, Campbell then studied at Princeton Theological Seminary, beginning in 1945. He earned his Bachelor of Divinity and Master of Theology degrees at Princeton in 1948 and 1949, respectively.

== As a Presbyterian minister ==
=== Pennsylvania churches ===
Following his ordination by the Presbyterian Church in 1949, Campbell was pastor of the First Presbyterian Church of Stroudsburg, Pennsylvania, between 1949 and 1954, where his weekly sermons were broadcast on a local radio station, WVPO. He then became minister at another Pennsylvania church, the First Presbyterian Church of York, serving there for eight years, from 1954 to 1962. While in the "White Rose City", as York is called, Campbell had a weekly radio program, Treasury of Christian Devotion, on a local York station, WSBA (AM). He also spoke at mission churches in Alaska and Cuba.

=== First Presbyterian Church, Ann Arbor, Michigan ===
Between 1962 and 1968, Campbell was minister at the 2,300-member First Presbyterian Church of Ann Arbor, Michigan. In 1965, he led the church in providing shelter for Marina Oswald, the forlorn widow of John F. Kennedy-assassin Lee Harvey Oswald, so that she could study English at the University of Michigan in Ann Arbor. He was also preacher of the year in 1965 at National Presbyterian Church in Washington, D.C.

University of Michigan Wolverines quarterback Bob Timberlake said of attending the church, "This brought me under the guidance of Dr. Ernest T. Campbell ... he is a great speaker". Prior to that, the 1964 All-American football player said his "whole life was really off the track". Timberlake became a committed Christian, teaching Sunday school and starting a campus chapter of the Fellowship of Christian Athletes. After playing college and NFL football, he attended Campbell's alma mater, Princeton Theological Seminary, and became an ordained Presbyterian minister himself.

Campbell's collected sermons preached at the Ann Arbor church are now archived at the University of Michigan's Bentley Historical Library.

=== Riverside Church, New York City ===
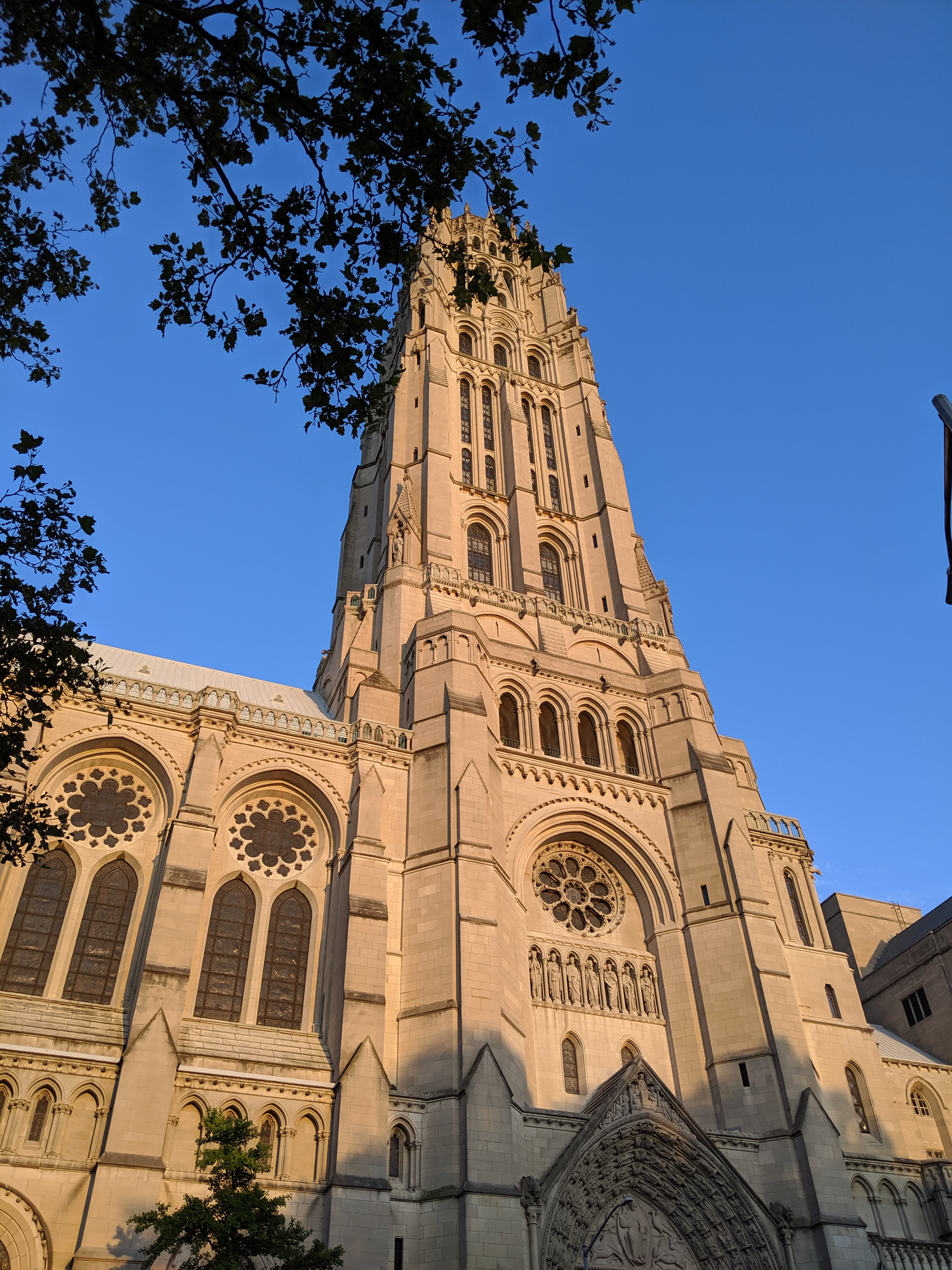
The Riverside Church tower

Campbell was called to be the first Presbyterian preaching minister at the interdenominational Riverside Church of 3,500 members in New York City in 1968. By then, he was noted for his eloquent preaching and had already spoken to a national audience on the NBC Radio Network's Protestant Hour. The New York Times said Campbell had a "penchant and flare for preaching", albeit having an "aloof scholarly demeanor". In addition to being heard weekly over the church's own radio station, WRVR-FM, he also addressed millions preaching on NBC's weekly National Radio Pulpit and Protestant Hour radio programs. Campbell was a guest preacher at many prominent Protestant churches, including Fifth Avenue Presbyterian Church, Madison Avenue Presbyterian Church, and St. Thomas Church in New York City, as well as historic New York Avenue Presbyterian Church in Washington, D.C.

When Campbell was installed at Riverside on November 17, 1968, he said his approach to ministry was to reconcile the polarization between those who emphasize personal Christianity in the life of the believer and those who stress social activism, believing that both are needed for the individual to have an effective faith in the modern world. During Campbell's tenure at the congregationally-governed Riverside Church, however, he contended with dissension among the ministerial staff and the various church boards and committees, along with controversy generated by some of his provocative sermons. In a reorganization implemented in 1974, Campbell was named senior minister and given significantly increased administrative responsibilities. This change resulted in Campbell feeling that he had less time to devote to study and sermon preparation. Consequently, Campbell surprised the church board by announcing his resignation in June 1976, saying the administrative demands of his position had deprived him of "sufficient joy and satisfaction". His final sermon preached from the Riverside Church pulpit took place on July 4, 1976, the nation's Bicentennial Day.

== Later years, legacy and death ==
Campbell influenced aspiring ministers, lecturing at various seminaries besides his own alma mater, Princeton Theological Seminary, including Union Theological Seminary near Riverside Church, Pittsburgh Theological Seminary, and Fuller Theological Seminary in California. Between 1982 and 1989, Campbell was Professor of Homiletics at Garrett–Evangelical Theological Seminary. In 2005, he created the Ernest Campbell Endowed Fund in Homiletics to reward a graduating senior at Garrett–Evangelical Theological Seminary for outstanding preaching. Campbell authored three books: The Christian Manifesto, Where Cross the Crowded Ways, and Locked in a Room with Open Doors. He wrote hymn lyrics, A City Dweller's Prayer, in 1971. Set to the tune "All Saints New" by Henry Cutler (1824–1902), it was added as an endpaper pastedown to the inside back cover of the Pilgrim Hymnal (1958) for congregational use at Riverside Church in the 1970s.

Campbell was awarded an honorary Doctor of Literature degree from Grove City College and a Doctor of Divinity honorary degree from Westminster College in 1958. In 1998, a doctoral candidate at Drew University wrote his dissertation on Campbell's sermons, Ernest T. Campbell: prophetic preaching in the 1960s.

In the 1980s–1990s, Campbell continued to speak frequently as a guest preacher at various churches and Bible conferences nationwide. He often gave a sermon series at the summer gatherings of the Mount Gretna Campmeeting in Pennsylvania.

Campbell died at his New York City home on July 9, 2010, at age 86. He was survived by his wife, Joan Campbell, two sons, and two stepsons. A memorial service was held in September at Riverside Church, where he was extolled as "active on behalf of civil rights, migrant workers, a more humane national budget and fairer treatment for the LGBT community". He is remembered for some of his quips and sayings, such as: "Some people have the idea that if you raise hell, you're prophetic. I have the idea that if you lower heaven, you're prophetic".
