= Memorials to Giuseppe Verdi =

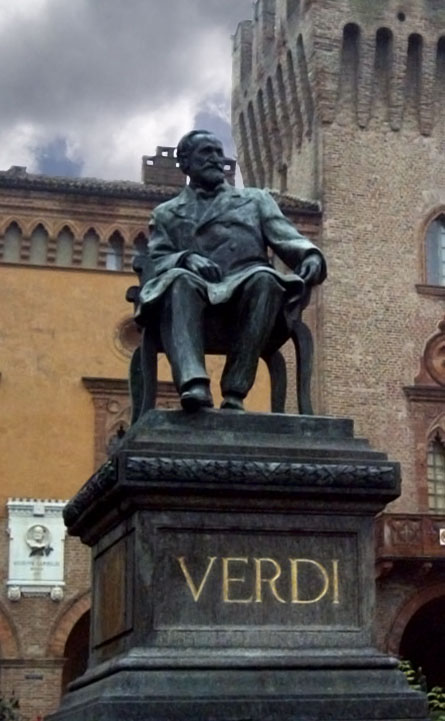
Luigi Secchi's 1913 statue of Verdi in Busseto

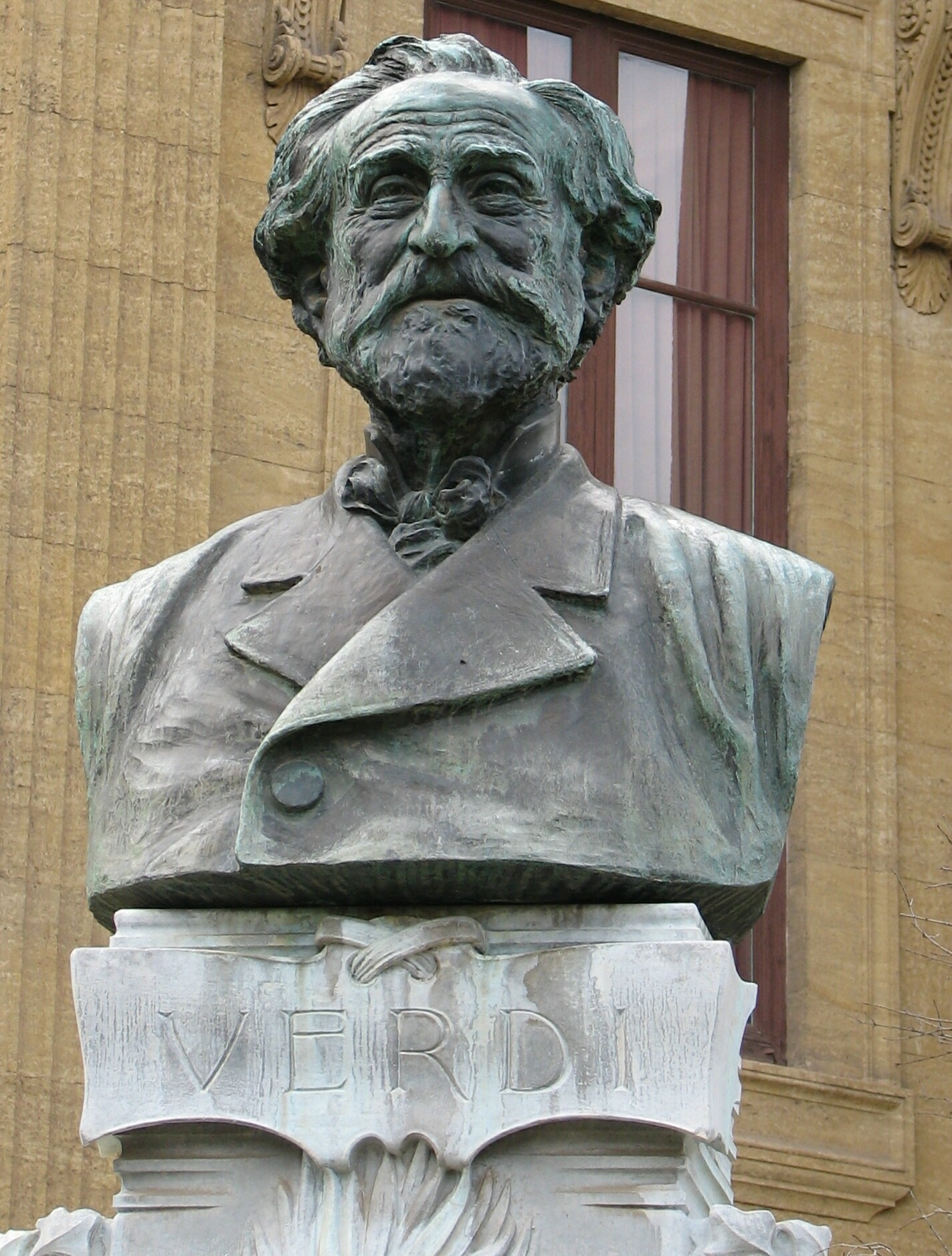
Verdi's bust outside the Teatro Massimo in Palermo

The following is a compilation of memorials to the composer Giuseppe Verdi in the form of physical monuments and institutions and other entities named after him.

== Music schools and theatres ==
There are three music conservatories, the Milan Conservatory and those in Turin and Como, and many theatres named after Verdi in Italy.

The theatres include:

- Teatro Verdi in Bolzano
- Teatro Verdi in Brindisi
- Teatro Giuseppe Verdi in Busseto
- Teatro Verdi in Casciana Terme Lari
- Teatro Verdi in Cava de' Tirreni
- Teatro Verdi in Cesena
- Teatro Verdi in Crevalcore
- Teatro Verdi in Florence
- Teatro Verdi in Forlimpopoli
- Teatro Communale Giuseppe Verdi in Gorizia
- Teatro Verdi in Milan, also known as Teatro del Buratto
- Teatro Verdi in Montecatini Terme
- Teatro Verdi in Padua, designed by architect Achille Sfondrini
- Teatro Verdi in Pisa
- Teatro Verdi in Poggibonsi
- Teatro Giuseppe Verdi in Pollenza
- Teatro Verdi in Pordenone
- Teatro Verdi in Salerno
- Teatro Verdi in San Severo, designed by architect Cesare Bazzani
- Teatro Verdi in Santa Croce sull'Arno
- Teatro Verdi in Sassari
- Teatro Verdi in Genoa (near Sestri Ponente)
- Teatro Verdi in Terni
- Teatro Lirico Giuseppe Verdi in Trieste
- Teatro Verdi in Muggia
- Teatro Verdi in Vicenza

== Statues ==
=== Italy ===
Verdi's hometown of Busseto displays Luigi Secchi's 1913 statue of a seated Verdi.

=== United States ===
The Giuseppe Verdi Monument, a marble monument in his honor, is located in Verdi Square in Manhattan, New York City. The monument by Pasquale Civiletti was dedicated on 11 October 1906. It includes a statue of Verdi and life-sized statues of four of his well-known characters: Aida, Otello, Falstaff, and Leonora.

Carlo Nicoli’s bust of Verdi was erected in Tower Grove Park in Saint. Louis in 1887.

Philadelphia’s Fairmount Park is the home on G.B.Bashanellifuso’s bust of Verdi, "a gift of the Italian Colony of Philadelphia to the city in 1907."

A bust of Verdi by Orazio Grossone was placed in San Francisco's Golden Gate Park in 1914.

Bob Jones University in Greenville, South Carolina has put on many of Verdi's operas and has a memorial to him inside their Gustafson Fine Arts Center.

== Other ==
The International Astronomical Union named the impact crater Verdi on the planet Mercury after the composer in 1979

Verdi Inlet (71°36′S 74°30′W) is an ice-filled inlet lying between Pesce Peninsula and Harris Peninsula, on the north side of the Beethoven Peninsula, situated in the southwest portion of Alexander Island, Antarctica. It was named for the composer by the United Kingdom Antarctic Place-Names Committee.

A minor planet has been named 3975 Verdi.

The towns of Verdi, Nevada and Verdi, California, which abut on the state line, were named after Verdi by Charles Crocker, founder of the Central Pacific Railroad, when he pulled a slip of paper from a hat and read the name of the Italian opera composer in 1868. Verdi, Minnesota is named both for the composer and the green fields surrounding the town.
