= Needle Park =

Needle Park is a nickname of several places associated with drug use:

- Verdi Square in Manhattan, New York City
- Sherman Square in Manhattan, New York City
- Platzspitz park in Switzerland
- O'Bryant Square in Portland, Oregon, United States

== See also ==
- The Panic in Needle Park, a 1971 film
