= Teatro Verdi =

Teatro Verdi may refer to:

- Teatro Verdi (Brindisi), Brindisi
- Teatro Giuseppe Verdi, Busseto
- Teatro Verdi (Florence), Florence
- Teatro Verdi (Padova), Padova, by architect Achille Sfondrini
- Teatro Verdi (Pisa), Pisa
- Teatro Verdi (Salerno), Salerno
- Teatro Verdi (San Severo), San Severo
- Teatro Verdi (Sassari), Sassari
- Teatro Lirico Giuseppe Verdi, Trieste

== See also ==
- Memorials to Giuseppe Verdi
