= James Mills (author) =

American novelist (1932–2011)

- Born: James Spencer Mills III; May 20, 1932
- Died: December 4, 2011 (aged 79); Saint-Laurent-du-Maroni, France
- Occupations: Novelist; screenwriter; journalist

James Spencer Mills III (May 20, 1932 – December 4, 2011) was an American novelist, screenwriter and journalist.

Mills wrote two New York Times bestsellers, Report to the Commissioner, a novel, and The Underground Empire, a study of international narcotics trafficking. His books The Panic in Needle Park and Report to the Commissioner were later made into major motion pictures by 20th Century Fox and United Artists respectively. The credibility of The Underground Empire was challenged in a lengthy front-page article in the Los Angeles Times.

== Life and career ==
James Mills was born May 20, 1932, in Milwaukee, Wisconsin to Rear Admiral Ralph Erskine Mills and Elisabeth Stevens Mills. He went on to graduate from Princeton University in 1954.

He worked for UPI, Life magazine, and for three U.S. commercial television networks as a writer and consultant.

The 1971 film The Panic in Needle Park, starring Al Pacino in his second film appearance, was based on Mills' book of the same name about the heroin culture at Verdi Square and Sherman Square on New York City's Upper West Side near 72nd Street and Broadway. The screenplay was written by Joan Didion and John Gregory Dunne.

The Harvard Crimson review stated of Report to the Commissioner that: "James Mills has created just such an interloper: a story of deep suspense which moves on several planes of confrontation, ambition and human interaction. Slickly written, carefully strung together, Report to the Commissioner skirts the obvious and pivots on the unexpected; in the best tradition of detective stories The 1975 film version of Report to the Commissioner, featuring Richard Gere in his screen debut with a minor supporting role, was made after "the movie rights were snapped up by a motion picture industry starved for clever suspense stories."

On July 17, 1986, after the publication of The Underground Empire, Mills was invited to speak at a hearing of the United States House Committee on Foreign Affairs investigating the torture murder of Drug Enforcement Administration (DEA) agent Kiki Camarena.

On October 2, 1986, the Los Angeles Times published a 5,000-word investigation into The Underground Empire by David Cay Johnston, naming more than 40 sources, subjects, and witnesses who asserted that Mills had fabricated significant claims and misstated many facts. In a sidebar article on journalistic ethics, Mills acknowledged to the newspaper that he never verified many facts. Later, a criminal appeals lawyer who Mills accused of being involved in drug trafficking, Barry Tarlow, sued Mills and his publisher. While the amount paid to settle the case was sealed, Tarlow said in 1992 that he would use part of the settlement money to buy a beachfront Malibu home.

Mills died in Saint-Laurent-du-Var, France on December 4, 2011, at the age of 79.

== Nonfiction books ==
- The Prosecutor. Farrar, Straus and Giroux, 1969. ISBN 0-374-23836-7
- On the Edge. Doubleday, 1975. ISBN 0-385-09853-7
- The Underground Empire: Where Crime and Governments Embrace. Doubleday, 1986. ISBN 0-385-17535-3

== Fiction books ==
- The Panic in Needle Park. Farrar, Straus and Giroux, 1966. ISBN 0-374-22968-6
- Report to the Commissioner. Farrar, Straus and Giroux, 1972. ISBN 0-374-24940-7
- One Just Man. Simon and Schuster, 1974. ISBN 0-671-21837-9
- The Seventh Power. E. P. Dutton, 1976. ISBN 0-525-20050-9
- The Truth About Peter Harley. E. P. Dutton, 1979. ISBN 0-525-22393-2
- The Power. Warner Books, 1990. ISBN 0-446-513938
- Haywire. Warner Books, 1995. ISBN 978-0-446-51619-8
- The Hearing. Warner Books, 1998. ISBN 978-0-446-51958-8

== Filmography ==
- The Panic in Needle Park
- Report to the Commissioner
