= Giuseppe Verdi Monument =

Sculpture in Manhattan, New York, U.S.

- U.S. National Register of Historic Places
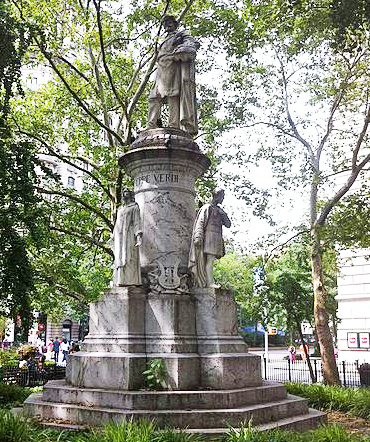

- Location within Manhattan Location within New York City Location within New York Location within the United States
- Location: Verdi Square, Manhattan, New York City
- Coordinates: 40°46′45″N 73°58′54″W
- Area: 2 acres (0.81 ha)
- Built: 1906
- Architect: Pasquale Civiletti
- NRHP reference No.: 90002223
- Added to NRHP: October 4, 1990

The Giuseppe Verdi Monument is a sculpture honoring composer Giuseppe Verdi in Verdi Square Park (between 72nd and 73rd Streets, Amsterdam Avenue, and Broadway) in Manhattan, New York City. The statue was created by Italian sculptor Pasquale Civiletti.

The monument measures 25.75 feet (7.85 m) tall and up to 18 feet (5.5 m) across. The pedestal is made of dark granite steps, topped by a cylinder, and measures 15 feet (4.6 m) tall. Statues of four characters from Verdi's operas are on the pedestal: Aida, Otello, Leonora of La forza del destino, and Falstaff. These statues respectively face north, east, south, and west. The character statues are made of white Carrara marble, with large marble lyres placed between them. The western side of the pedestal contains an etching with Civiletti's name. A time capsule is embedded in the Verdi monument's base. The main statue of Verdi, placed atop the pedestal, is also made of white Carrara marble.

The monument was dedicated on Columbus Day, October 12, 1906, by the Verdi Monument Committee chaired by Carlo Barsotti (1850–1927), an Italian–American who hoped to inspire young Italian Americans. He was the founding editor of the Il Progresso Italo-Americano Italian-American newspaper, and used its pages to raise funds for this and several other memorials including the Columbus Circle monument, an 1888 monument to Giuseppe Garibaldi in Washington Square Park, a monument to Giovanni da Verrazzano (1909) and the 1921 monument to Dante Alighieri in Dante Park.

A permanent maintenance endowment for the monument has been established by Bertolli USA. The monument is listed on the National Register of Historic Places.
