= Carlo Barsotti =

Italian-American newspaper and bank owner

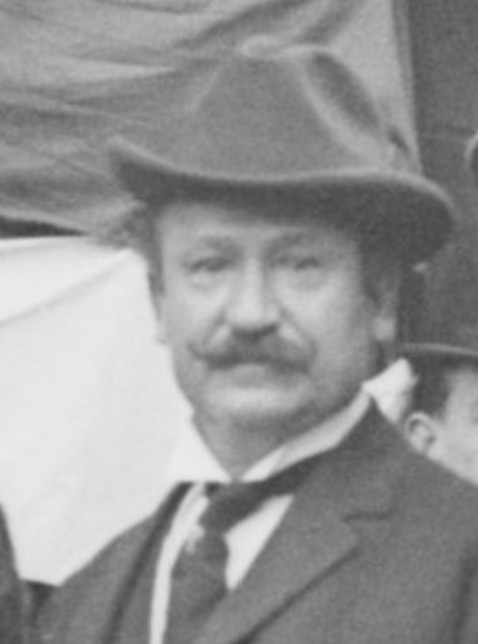
- Barsotti in 1914
- Born: 4 January 1850; San Giuliano Terme, Grand Duchy of Tuscany, Italy
- Died: 30 March 1927 (aged 77); Coytesville (New Jersey), United States
- Occupation(s): Newspaper and bank owner
- Known for: Founder of Il Progresso Italo-Americano newspaper Founder of the Italian American Bank

Carlo Barsotti (4 January 1850 – 30 March 1927) was an Italian-American newspaper and bank owner.

== Emigration to New York ==
Barsotti was born in Bagni di San Giuliano (now San Giuliano Terme) near Pisa in the Grand Duchy of Tuscany, on 4 January 1850, and emigrated from Italy to New York City in 1872.

After working in various roles—including as a foreman on several railroad projects that employed large numbers of Italian laborers—Carlo Barsotti built his fortune first in banking, then as a printer, and later as the owner of a small chain of low-cost lodging houses. Though he referred to them as hotels, many critics insisted they were little more than brothels.

His success began primarily through his work as a banchista, or informal banker, a role that positioned him as a prominent figure within the Italian immigrant community. These unofficial private bankers offered a range of services to fellow immigrants: sending remittances to Italy, securing employment, collecting savings, and arranging travel. While such services provided essential support to newly arrived Italians, they also left many vulnerable to exploitation—particularly those with limited education or resources.

== Il Progresso ==
In September 1880, Carlo Barsotti, along with Vincenzo Polidori, founded Il Progresso Italo-Americano in New York City – the first Italian-language daily newspaper in the United States. Its inaugural issue was published on September 29, 1880. The paper quickly grew to become the most widely circulated foreign-language newspaper in the city.

Il Progresso was established as a direct challenge to Giovanni Francesco Secchi de Casali’s weekly L'Eco d'Italia. De Casali had dismissed Barsotti's reports on the efforts of an Italian American committee formed in response to the 1880 death sentence of Pietro Balbo, convicted of murdering his wife. Frustrated that the only Italian newspaper in New York showed no concern for the fate of a compatriot facing execution, Barsotti resolved to create a more engaged and outspoken daily.

To manage the paper's operations, Barsotti hired Adolfo Rossi, a recent immigrant from Italy with no prior experience in journalism. Despite his inexperience, Rossi proved highly capable and helped turn Il Progresso into a thriving publication as its editor-in-chief.

Barsotti’s role as a newspaper owner was closely tied to his banking activities. The publication of a popular Italian-language newspaper not only elevated his public profile but also created a favorable climate for his financial ventures among Italian immigrants.

== Benefactor ==
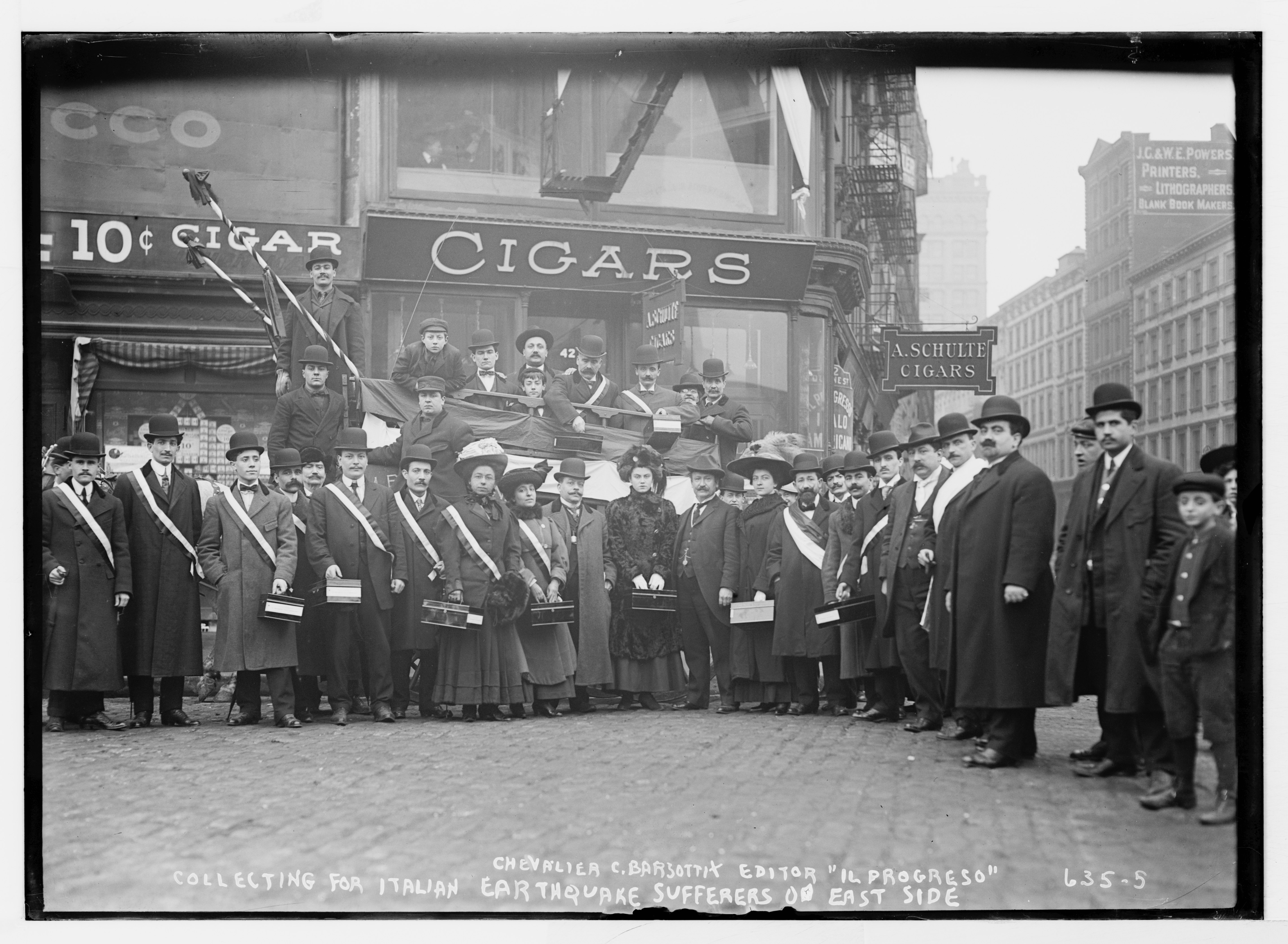
Barsotti and others collecting for Italian earthquake sufferers, East Side, New York, in 1914

King Umberto I of Italy rewarded him the distinction of the title Cavaliere in 1888. With numerous awards from the country of Venezuela and the Italian Red Cross, he was a very notable Italian figure in late 19th century America.

Barsotti used his newspaper as a tool to raise funds for monuments to great Italian figures, which were disseminated all over New York City's parks. Examples of his funding efforts are Washington Square (Giuseppe Garibaldi), Battery Park (Giovanni Da Verrazzano), Verdi Square (Giuseppe Verdi) and Columbus Circle (Christopher Columbus).

After rapidly expanding his banking business, Barsotti declared bankruptcy in 1897, resulting in the loss of savings for many of his fellow Italians.

In 1922, he donated $250,000 to his homeland for the construction of a tunnel under Monte Pisano. He died in Coytesville, (New Jersey), on 30 March 1927. In 1875, Barsotti had married Margaret Heist, from Frankfurt (Germany), with whom he had two children, Carlo and Anna.

== See also ==
- Dante Park
