= Adolfo Rossi =

Italian journalist, writer and diplomat

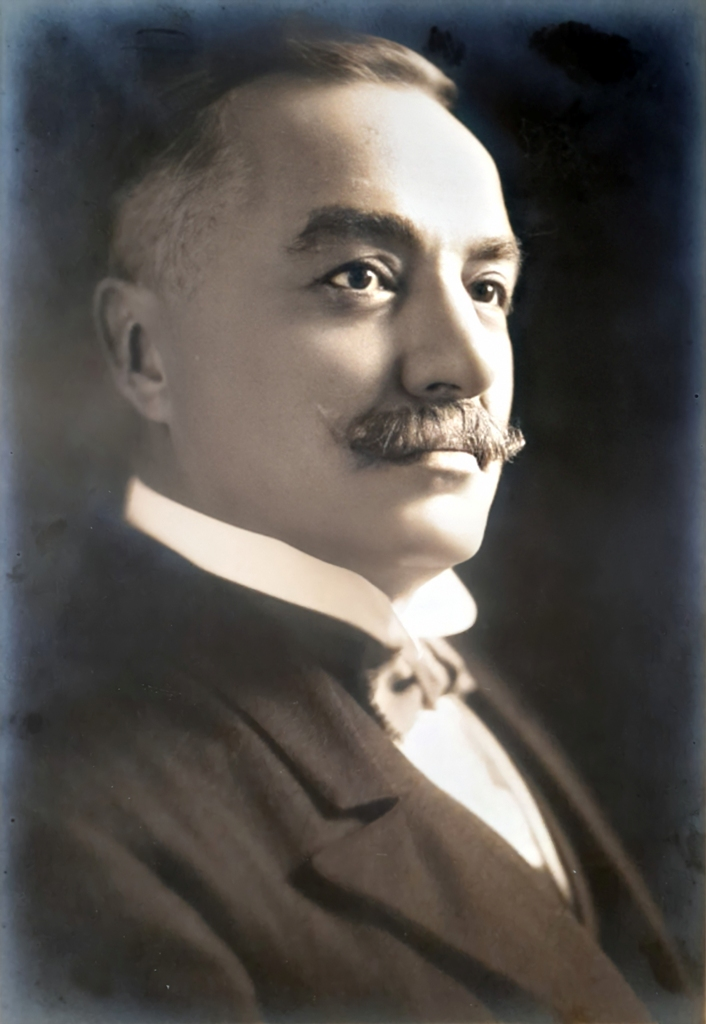
- Adolfo Rossi, c. 1908
- Born: 30 September 1857; Valdentro di Lendinara, Kingdom of Lombardy–Venetia, Austrian Empire
- Died: 28 July 1921 (aged 63); Buenos Aires, Argentina
- Occupations: Journalist; writer; diplomat

Adolfo Rossi (30 September 1857 – 28 July 1921) was an Italian journalist, writer, and diplomat. Starting as an aspiring but poor emigrant in New York City, he helped establish the Italian-language daily Il Progresso Italo-Americano despite having little prior experience. Upon returning to Italy, he rose to prominence as a journalist, contributing to the country's leading newspapers and gaining recognition for both his investigative work at home and his war reporting abroad.

He later served as an itinerant inspector for the Italian government's General Commissariat for Emigration (Italian: Commissariato Generale dell'Emigrazione). In this role, his thorough reports on the harsh conditions endured by Italian migrants in Brazil and South Africa were instrumental in driving reforms to Italy's migration policies. After being promoted to General Commissioner of Migration, he continued to advise the government, investigating and exposing the hardships faced by Italian migrants in the United States and Argentina.

He was subsequently appointed to the Italian Ministry of Foreign Affairs as a diplomat in the Americas. Shortly after assuming the post of Consul general and Minister Plenipotentiary in Argentina, he died of a heart attack in 1921. As a journalist, Adolfo Rossi brought significant stylistic and methodological innovations to Italian journalism, becoming one of the most widely read correspondents of his era. His reports as an emigration inspector caused a public stir and played a significant role in reshaping migration policy in Rome.

== Early life ==
Adolfo Rossi was born on 30 September 1857, in the hamlet of Valdentro di Lendinara in the province of Rovigo, Veneto, in northern Italy, to Giuseppe Rossi and Filomena Malin. He began his education at the local Ginnasio, and later attended the Liceo di Rovigo. However, due to the sudden death of his father, he was forced to leave school before graduating. His first job was at the Lendinara Post Office, where he came under the mentorship of Alberto Mario – a journalist and an early supporter of Italian unification (Risorgimento) who was deeply influenced by the ideas of Giuseppe Mazzini and a close ally of Giuseppe Garibaldi –, who encouraged him to continue his education.

As a young and aspiring writer, he published a novel on "the condition of young elementary schoolmistresses" in Bacchiglione, a journal based in Padua. With the help of Mario, he also succeeded in publishing several novellas in Vita Nuova, a Milanese publication edited by Arcangelo Ghisleri. (Note: One of these novellas, Lo zingaro (The Gypsy), appeared in the appendix of the first issue of Il Progresso Italo-Americano on 13 December 1880.) In 1879, he founded a bimonthly family magazine titled Il Grillo del focolare (The Cricket in the Fireplace).

In the summer of 1879, Rossi left for America almost in secret, seeking adventure and without knowing a word of English. Later, in his book Un italiano in America, he described why he escaped the prospect of a tedious life in a provincial town and his reasons for moving to America:

No, I won't continue to vegetate here, I thought. The world is big; there is America, and New York is a vast metropolis. I will go there, study those famous Americans, learn English. In the beginning, I will work with my hands, but in the country of activity and above all, liberty, I will learn better to understand life and men, and one day I will return to Italy rich at least in experience. Then it will be easier to dedicate myself completely to journalism.

At Southampton he embarked on the Canada, bound for New York City. During the Atlantic crossing in third-class steerage, he was robbed of all his belongings. Upon arriving in New York, he lived the life of any desperate immigrant and took on any job he could find – street vendor selling Japanese fans and sparkling water in Coney Island, day labourer, pastry chef, waiter in the Brunswick hotel – and learning to speak and write in English, until a new opportunity arose: the foundation in 1880 of the daily Italian language newspaper Il Progresso Italo-Americano by Carlo Barsotti, which for over a century would remain the largest Italian-language newspaper in the United States. Hired as a jack of all trades in December 1880, Rossi was the editor and the sole correspondent, busy from 9 am to midnight. This marked a turning point in Rossi's life.

After six months, in July 1881, stressed by the editorial pace and some inevitable editorial differences, he left the newspaper to travel to the Rocky Mountains area to work at the construction of railway works to connect the gold and silver mines in Colorado, which had recently joined the Union as the 38th state and was in the midst of the Colorado Silver Boom and rapid railroad expansion. In his book he wrote:

What is the point of emigrating to America only to stay in a seaport, without experiencing the immense solitude, the lakes, the mountains and the wonders of this great continent?

Contracted by the Denver, South Park and Pacific Railroad, but unsuited for the demanding labour of railroad construction, Rossi instead found work as a pastry chef and waiter in the mining town of Breckenridge, surrounded by gold prospectors, ongoing conflicts with railway companies, and scenes of frontier justice – including lynchings. Eventually, he was hired as an accountant by a railway company to travel on horseback between various work camps, inspecting progress and conditions.

As winter approached and railway work came to a halt, Il Progresso urged him to return to New York, offering improved terms. He accepted, and made his way back and incorporated his experiences into the book Vita d'America (Life in America). (Note: The book was in fact first published as a series of stories in Il Progresso, divided into 46 episodes and published between 25 April and 7 July 1882, entitled Vita d'America. In 1889, an earlier version had been published as Nacociù, La Venere Americana: Avventure degli emigranti al nuovo mondo. (Nacociù, The American Venus: Adventure of the Emigrants in The New World).)

== Journalistic career ==
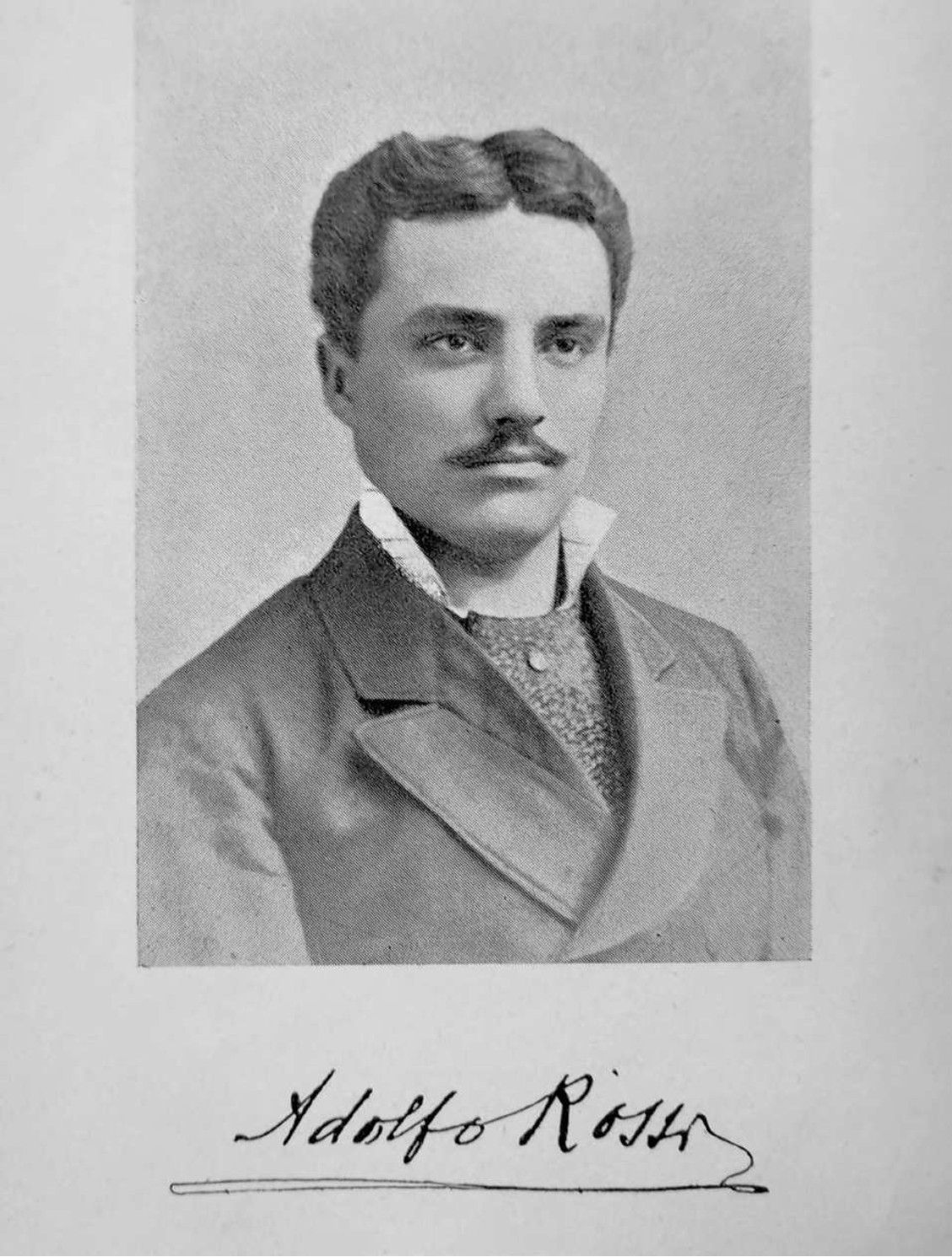
Adolfo Rossi in 1880

Despite the lack of editorial experience, Ross turned Il Progresso into a thriving publication as its editor-in-chief. He faced numerous challenges: a minimal staff, printers unfamiliar with Italian who introduced frequent errors, and the logistical hurdles of daily production. Rossi translated local news from English, adapted content from Italian sources, proofread each edition, and handled the layout. One of his earliest major stories was a series of articles defending the unacknowledged inventor of the telephone, the Italian Antonio Meucci, who was then living in poverty in Clifton, Staten Island — in the same modest home that had housed Garibaldi three decades earlier. This coverage caught the attention of even the mainstream American press, which echoed Il Progresso's key arguments in Meucci's case against Edison and his associates.

He also quickly learned the journalistic technique from overseas: concise writing, facts separated from opinions, objective narration, researching the event where it happens, so as to report without filters or conditioning. His experience in America, including the early, chaotic days at Il Progresso, and the appalling conditions of the Italian immigrant community in the slums of Five Points, culminated in the publication of the book Un italiano in America (An Italian in America) in 1892, which gained widespread acclaim. It was followed in 1894 by a second volume, Nel paese dei dollari (In the Land of Dollars), further cementing his reputation as a writer and journalist. (Note: A review of the two books is in Durante's Italoamericana, including an English translation of Rossi's chapter on Five Points in Un italiano in America.)

In the meantime, in New York he had befriended Ferdinando Fontana and Dario Papa, the latter an already influential editor of the Milanese Corriere della Sera newspaper and on a trip in the United States to study the organisational model of the New York Herald, one of the leading U.S. daily newspaper of the time. Rossi convinced Fontana and Papa to contribute to Il Progresso. After five years in the U.S., he returned to Italy with Papa in 1884, with solid professional experience as a journalist. It is very likely that his friendship with Papa, who, like him, had become convinced that the American style of journalism should be introduced in Italy, assured him of a job at the Corriere. (Note: Traditional Italian journalism at that time was dominated by academics with no experience in current news reporting but with a sophisticated prose style and an abundance of opinions on everything. Rossi found Italian journalism "stylistically over-literary and semantically uninformative.")

=== Back in Italy ===
Drawing on his American experience, Rossi quickly established himself in the Italian newspaper industry. Just over two decades had passed since Italian unification, and the country's media landscape was undergoing significant transformation with the rise of modern daily newspapers – some of which, like the Corriere della Sera (Milan), La Stampa (Turin), and Il Gazzettino (Venice), are still in circulation, while others, such as Il Secolo (Milan) and La Tribuna (Rome), have since disappeared. Over the final two decades of the 19th century, Rossi contributed to nearly all the major newspapers of the era. Over the years, he developed his distinctive reportage style, which involved "taking the train whenever there was an important event anywhere in the country and telegraphing – without concern for cost and with absolute priority – to his newspaper," and using the concise journalistic technique he had acquired in New York.

Rossi settled in Rome, where he began with a four-year tenure at Il Messaggero, a sensationalist city newspaper with a circulation of 35,000 copies. He notably covered the 1884 cholera outbreak in Naples, going so far as to outpace official death reports by touring the city in a carriage and personally counting the corpses prepared for burial. From 1888 onward, Rossi spent nearly two years abroad in Paris, contributing to various publications, including a newspaper in New York. During this period, he reported on the unfolding Boulangist crisis (1888–1889) and the 1889 Paris Exposition – highlighted by the construction of the Eiffel Tower – as well as dispatching vivid portrayals of Parisian variétés (variety shows).

=== At La Tribuna ===
The next step in his career came when in the course of 1889, he joined La Tribuna, the leading daily newspaper in Rome with a circulation of 100,000 copies. In a series of articles, he painted a picture of the 'unknown Rome' of the underprivileged and those who had fallen through the cracks, and his style of local reporting became a model of the genre. In the summer of 1893, Rossi reported on a high-profile trial of outlaw brigands from the Maremma region. His coverage went beyond the courtroom, offering a detailed reconstruction of two decades of brigand activity and shedding light on the rule of Domenico Tiburzi, the most notorious of the bandits. Widely cited in both the Italian and international press, including Le Figaro, Rossi's reporting is still regarded today as a remarkable account of the socio-cultural conditions that allowed brigandage to thrive in the region.

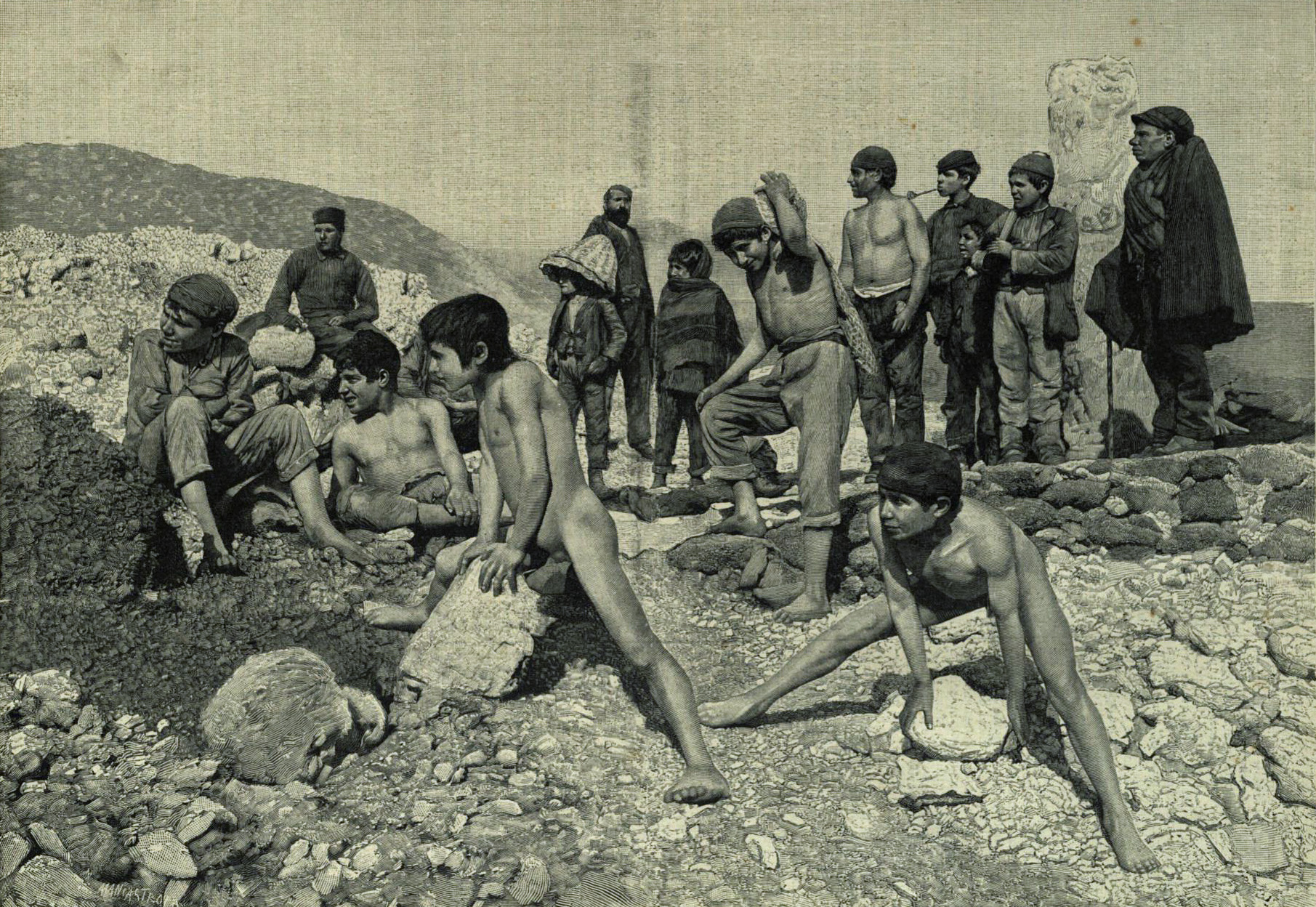
Group of carusi in the sulfur mines of Sicily, 1894

In October 1893, he investigated firsthand the turmoil in Sicily sparked by the Fasci Siciliani movement for La Tribuna. He was the only journalist to travel to the island at a time when the mainstream press in northern Italy echoed the government's stance, framing the unrest as a matter of public order and relying mainly on police reports. Rossi traveled extensively across Sicily, interviewing members and leaders of the Fasci and bringing their voices to light. During his journey in Sicily, he visited the sulfur-mining towns, and described the horrific labour conditions of the carusi, minors of eight or nine years of age that worked in conditions of near-slavery that sparked public outrage. Rossi, by then a seasoned war correspondent, wrote that no spectacle had affected him as deeply as that of the conditions of the carusi. He revealed a reality of severe poverty and exploitation in Sicily, arguing that the situation called for "political solutions, not military repression."

In December, La Tribuna, aligning with Prime Minister Francesco Crispi's colonial aspirations, dispatched Rossi to Italian Eritrea, where he would stay for approximately three months. This first mission marked Rossi's initial encounter with the region, and his reports offered a detailed account of Italy's expansion into Eritrea and Ethiopia (then known as Abyssinia), following the Italian victory at the Second Battle of Agordat on 21 December 1893 against an army of Mahdist rebels. After describing the Agordat battlefield – strewn with a thousand unburied corpses, left to hyenas and vultures – Rossi travelled extensively throughout the Italian colony, from Assab to Massawa and deep into the highland interior.

Upon returning from Eritrea, Rossi saw how dramatically the situation in Sicily had worsened. Crispi had crushed the Fasci Siciliani, authorizing the use of deadly force against demonstrations, imposed martial law on the island, suppressed the freedoms of association, the press, and speech, dissolved the Fasci (workers' leagues), arrested thousands, established military tribunals, sentenced movement leaders to long prison terms, and sent thousands into forced internal exile – guilty only of having called for social justice before the nation. Rossi revised his reports, added an introduction and a conclusion that defended the Fasci leaders in jail, and compiled them into a book. Since its publication, this unique work has been widely cited and remains a key source for anyone writing about the Fasci Siciliani. The Sicilian deputy Napoleone Colajanni drew on Rossi's accounts during parliamentary debates, using them as part of his efforts to challenge the government's response.

=== At the Corriere della Sera ===
Rossi grew increasingly disillusioned with the editorial direction of La Tribuna, which openly supported Prime Minister Crispi's repressive domestic policies and colonial ambitions. Crispi had brutally crushed the Fasci Siciliani, and editors of La Tribuna reproached him for the negative tone of his Eritrean dispatches in early 1894. Compounding the tensions, the newspaper itself had become entangled in the Banca Romana scandal, with some of its journalists implicated alongside prominent politicians and corrupt bank officials. He moved to Milan and after a brief stint with La Sera, the prestigious Corriere della Sera newspaper hired Rossi as an editor assigned specifically to travel and to long-term and war reporting.

On 16 November, the 1894 Southern Calabria earthquake struck southern Calabria and eastern Sicily with its epicentre in Palmi, Calabria, causing a tsunami. Rossi travelled to the affected region, serving both as a correspondent for the Corriere della Sera and as a delegate of the municipality of Milan, tasked with distributing aid to the victims. Rossi helped to organize mule caravans to deliver food to remote villages, distributed cash and supplies, sent prefabricated huts for the displaced, and established soup kitchens – efforts that deeply impacted the recovery of the earthquake-stricken communities. His reports on the disaster would later be hailed as "one of the finest pages" in the journalistic career of Rossi.

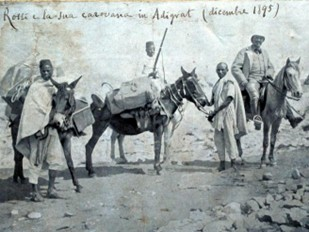
Adolfo Rossi in Eritrea, December 1895

In 1895, he returned to the Horn of Africa during the First Italo-Ethiopian War. First from January–May 1895 and subsequently in the autumn of that year when he witnessed major defeats such as the massacre at Amba Alagi and the Siege of Mekelle (Macallè in Italian) in January 1896. He was an outspoken critic of the military-led colonial administration and its expansion into sacred Abyssinian territory – warning that it would provoke a backlash, which was soon realized through Emperor Menelik II's counteroffensive. He condemned the colonial leadership as overly militaristic, driven by a thirst for medals and glory, and warned that Italian forces were overstretched, tasked with controlling an excessively large territory with too few men and inadequate logistical support. Rossi remained with general Oreste Baratieri, commander of the Italian forces, until mid-February but was expelled just days before the disastrous defeat of the Italian colonial army in the Battle of Adwa on 1 March 1896 for his "unpatriotic" reporting, his criticism of military decisions, and his repeated warnings against engaging Menelik's superior army.

Later in 1896, he travelled to Constantinople to cover the Armenian massacres, and was in Greece in 1897 during the war with the Ottoman Empire over the status of the Ottoman province of Crete. He also reported from Madrid, focusing on the unfolding crisis in Cuba, and in South Africa reporting on the Boer War. Meanwhile, Rossi rose to the position of chief editor alongside the founder and director, Eugenio Torelli Viollier. However, following Torelli's dismissal and the shift toward a more conservative editorial line – particularly after the May 1898 bread riots, the brutal repression that followed, the declaration of a state of siege, and the Bava Beccaris massacre, which included severe restrictions on press freedom – Rossi decided to leave the Corriere della Sera. He relocated to Livorno, where he took up the directorship of the Corriere Toscano.

=== Final years as journalist ===
After six months, in May 1899, he moved to the Secolo XIX in Genoa, but, again, dissatisfaction with the editorial line led him to accept the offer of the position of deputy editor of a newspaper in Venice, L'Adriatico, in September 1901. That year, at the height of the political uproar surrounding the notorious brigand Giuseppe Musolino, Rossi travelled to Calabria to report on the convicted criminal and fugitive who had captured national and international headlines. Musolino's bloody rampage and the authorities' ongoing failure to apprehend him had escalated into a political scandal, while legend and popular songs that soon flourished about Musolino described him as a folk hero. Rossi talked to prison guards, police officers, and magistrates, and visited Santo Stefano in Aspromonte, Musolino's home village, where he interviewed the fugitive's family and local residents.

According to historian John Dickie, Rossi's series of twenty reports for the Venetian newspaper L'Adriatico remains the most insightful account ever written about the picciotteria – the early form of the mafia-type organization later known as the 'Ndrangheta. Almost everyone Rossi encountered was convinced that Musolino had taken the oath of the picciotteria. During his investigation, Rossi also visited local prisons, where he observed the picciotti in their grey and tobacco-striped uniforms.

== Emigration inspector ==
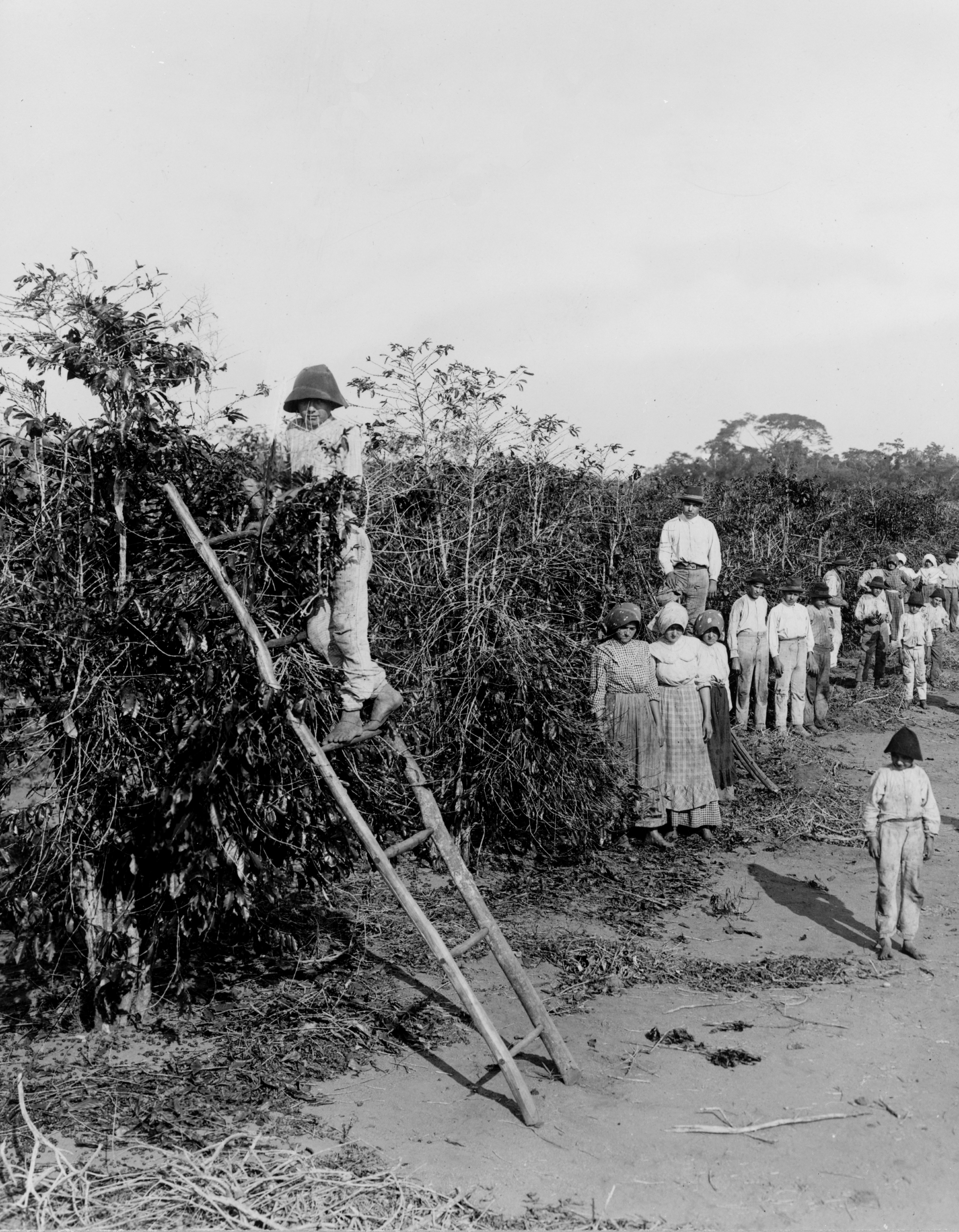
Italian immigrants on a Brazilian coffee plantation at the beginning of the 20th century

At the end of 1901, Rossi left journalism to take on a new role as a travelling inspector for the recently established General Commissariat of Emigration (Italian: Commissariato Generale dell'Emigrazione) at the time of the great Italian diaspora. "They told me that, with my travels to most parts of the world and my studies on our colonies, I would be an exceptionally well-suited emigration inspector," Rossi recounted. Before he was even officially employed, Rossi was tasked – on behalf of Foreign Minister Giulio Prinetti – with carrying out a mission to Brazil, following reports highlighting the poor conditions faced by Italian migrant workers on São Paulo's coffee plantations. Using his journalistic skills, he quickly undertook a pivotal investigation into the conditions faced by Italian migrants on the fazendas, travelling undercover, disguised as a peasant.

Rossi's report painted a dramatic picture of the semi-slavery conditions based on the testimonies collected: women raped, men whipped, discipline that "makes the fazenda look like a colony of convicts under compulsory residence," disease, failure to pay wages or delays in payment, misery. In some parts of the report, it is almost impossible not to think that "something of the old slave system still lingered on in the fazendas." (Note: Brazil was the last nation in the Western world to abolish slavery on 13 May 1888. By then, it was already in decline, and since the 1880s, the country had begun to attract European immigrant labour instead. However, "Accustomed to commanding slaves, the landowner did not abandon his mentality, and only after many years did he begin to make some concessions in terms of discipline and the methods used to maintain it," according to historian Angelo Trento, adding that "Abuses were mainly in the form of widespread physical violence, which included the blatant use of the whip, as in the days of slavery.") His preliminary findings, finally published in the Bollettino dell'Emigrazione (Emigration Bulletin) in July 1902, triggered the passage of the Prinetti Decree in March 1902 – the first Italian law protecting migrants – forbidding subsidized immigration and withdrawing the permission given to Brazil for the free importation of Italians to the farms and plantations in that country.

His extensive knowledge of conditions both in Italy and abroad, combined with sharp observational skills, made him exceptionally well-suited for the responsibilities of his new role. These primarily involved visiting key areas of Italian emigration, assessing local conditions, evaluating the enforcement of emigration laws, and ensuring that emigrants were treated fairly. His formal appointment took place in June 1902, supported by Pasquale Villari, Luigi Luzzatti, the Prime Minister Giuseppe Zanardelli and the Minister of the Interior Giovanni Giolitti, serving under Luigi Bodio, Italy's foremost statistician, who had been appointed as General Commissioner of Migration.

Rossi served first as a travelling inspector – he was the first to be appointed and, until 1905, the only one in service – and later as an emigration commissioner. In 1906, he was appointed as one of three senior officials who worked directly with the General Commissioner, a political appointee and the formal head of the administration. Over the course of his seven-year collaboration with the Commissariat, Rossi undertook a wide range of assignments, varying in nature and scope – from reporting on the construction of a canopy at the port of Palermo to analyzing the living conditions of Italians who had emigrated abroad. Wherever his missions took him, he not only met with local agents, officials and dignitaries but also gathered firsthand information directly from workers in the mines and fields.

=== Missions abroad ===
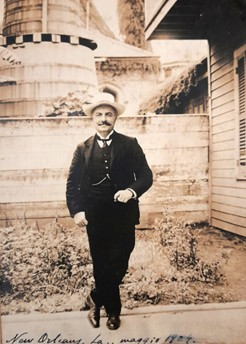
Adolfo Rossi in New Orleans, May 1904

After Brazil, his most significant missions were those in South Africa (1902–1903) and the United States (1904 and 1905). The inspection in Southern Africa, after verifying the local working conditions and the miserable wages granted to Italians – who were treated the same as Black and Chinese labourers, effectively placed at the bottom of the social hierarchy – led to the suspension of the departure of several thousand Italian migrants who had already formally applied to emigrate. The Emigration Commissariat objected to the use of Italian migrant labour as a means to lower existing wage levels in foreign countries.

Upon returning from South Africa, Rossi was sent on a confidential mission to Benadir, personally requested by Foreign Minister Prinetti. According to his instructions, he was to stop in the Somali region to inspect the activities of the Benadir Trading Company (Società commerciale per il Benadir), which had been entrusted with developing the Italian colony since 1898. His task was to investigate the credibility of serious allegations received by the government, including reports of slave trading, abuses in the justice system and customs administration, and poor conditions faced by the askaris stationed at various outposts. The Company's failure to suppress slavery was a decisive factor in the revocation of its mandate, and it ceased operations in 1904. From the following year, Italy assumed direct control of the colony.

The improvement of conditions for emigrants in the United States was the objective of two missions carried out between 1904 and 1905. During his first mission in 1904, Adolfo Rossi travelled across numerous American states from the Atlantic to the Pacific. He visited cities such as New York and Boston, as well as plantations in Mississippi and Arkansas, mines in Texas, and vineyards in Madera County, California. Rossi became convinced of the need to provide legal assistance to migrants and to facilitate their employment and job placement, to rescue poor immigrants – most of whom were illiterate and completely ignorant of the English language – from the extortion of the underworld and local bosses through the padrone system and recommended the use of a government supervised Labor Bureau instead.

The practical implementation of these recommendations became the focus of his second mission. Among the proposals he put forward were the allocation of dedicated funds for consuls to defend compatriots in court, and the establishment of a labour office headquartered in New York, with branches in major emigration centres. These measures were ultimately adopted, albeit with some modifications. In the tense climate of labour disputes and the oversupply of Italian labour in San Francisco, the Italian government tasked Rossi with conducting a survey to determine whether emigration to the city should be discouraged. He produced an extensive report following his visit and concluded that emigration to San Francisco ought indeed to be discouraged.

=== Emigration commissioner ===
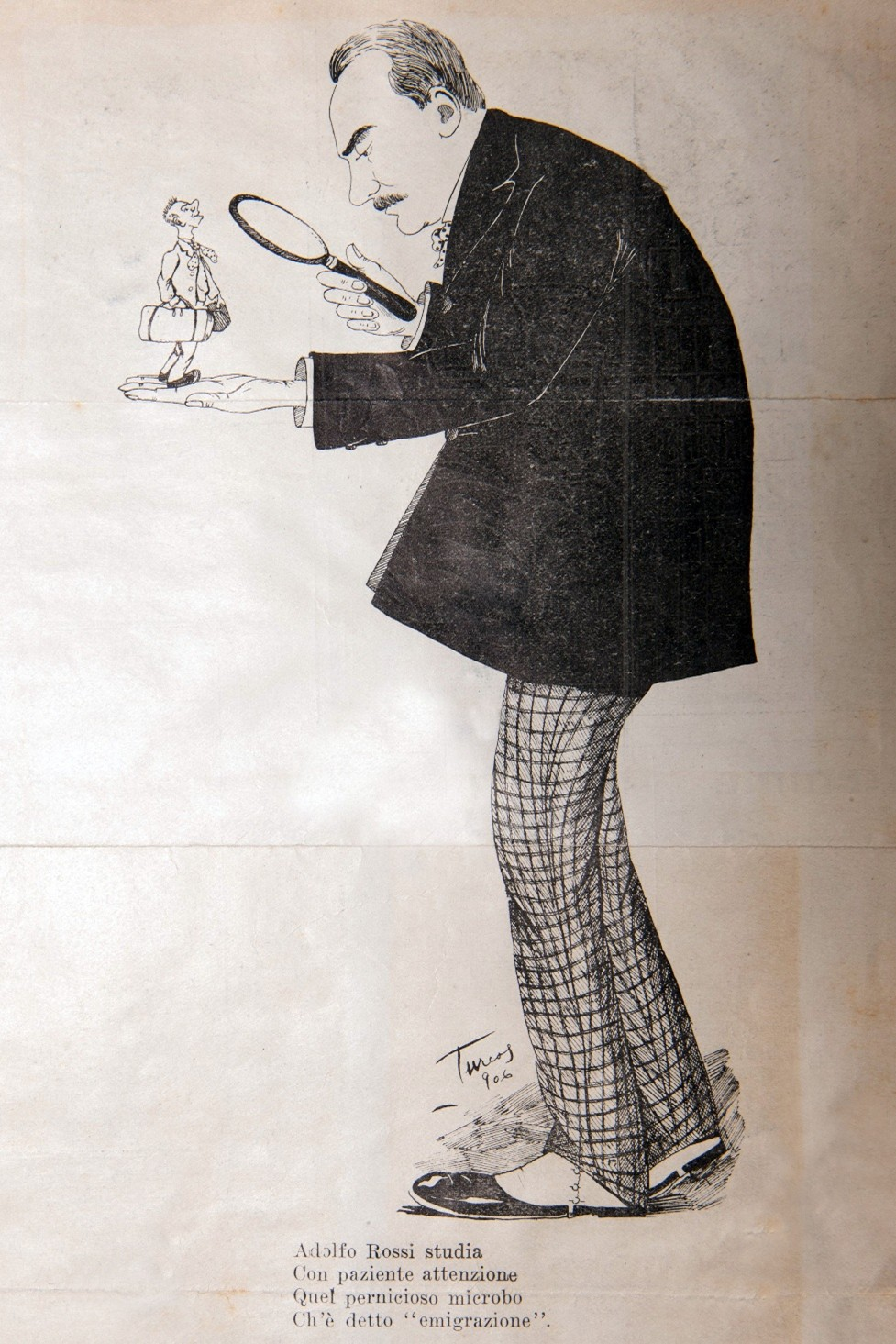
Caricature of Adolfo Rossi by Turcos, 1906 The text reads: "Adolfo Rossi studies; With patient attention; That pernicious microbe; Called 'emigration' "

Rossi investigated not only the fate of Italian emigrants abroad, but also the causes of emigration in southern Italy, in particular in Calabria and Basilicata (1907). After his promotion in 1906, he was tasked by Foreign Minister Tommaso Tittoni, to welcome members of the United States Immigration Commission of the U.S. Congress to study the phenomenon of emigration from Southern Italy and to identify ways to curb departures to the United States. In June 1907, he accompanied one of its members, William S. Bennet, on a journey in Calabria.

In the autumn of 1907, he accompanied an Italian parliamentary commission of inquiry into the conditions of the peasants in the southern provinces, which also included the deputy Francesco Saverio Nitti, a renowned meridionalist and population economist. The situation that Rossi found in the two regions appeared bleak, but the benefits of emigration appeared undoubtedly greater than the disadvantages. As he was told in Basilicata, conditions were harsh and "the peasant cannot resist the temptation to go. This is what is called the contagion of America." Improved conditions and better education in Italy, however, could reduce emigration and the exodus of workers from Italy.

In his role as a government official, Rossi often appeared in the media to clarify that the Italian Government did not actively encourage emigration. While acknowledging that Italy's growing population made emigration both necessary and acted as a safety valve, he also highlighted its drawbacks. In some provinces, he noted, the massive outflow of people led to a shortage of local labour despite rising wages. Rossi attributed the push for emigration not to government policy but to national and international steamship companies, which he accused of artificially inflating emigration beyond its natural levels to increase their profits.

Rossi's exposés of the harsh realities endured by Italian emigrants abroad were unflinching and uncompromising. He often summed up their plight as a national disgrace with a stark refrain: "This is the Italy of shame" (L'Italia della vergogna). However, according to Rossi, the shame was not to be blamed on the poor emigrants, but on the authorities who allowed them to emigrate under appalling conditions and left them to their fate.

== Diplomat and sudden death ==
In 1908, the final turning point in his life came when he was appointed to the Italian diplomatic service. He was appointed to serve as consul in Denver, in the United States. However, the transition was not without difficulty: his entry into the consular service – without having passed a public competition – sparked criticism from some officials within the corps, who formally contested his appointment. It was Francesco Saverio Nitti who came to his defence.

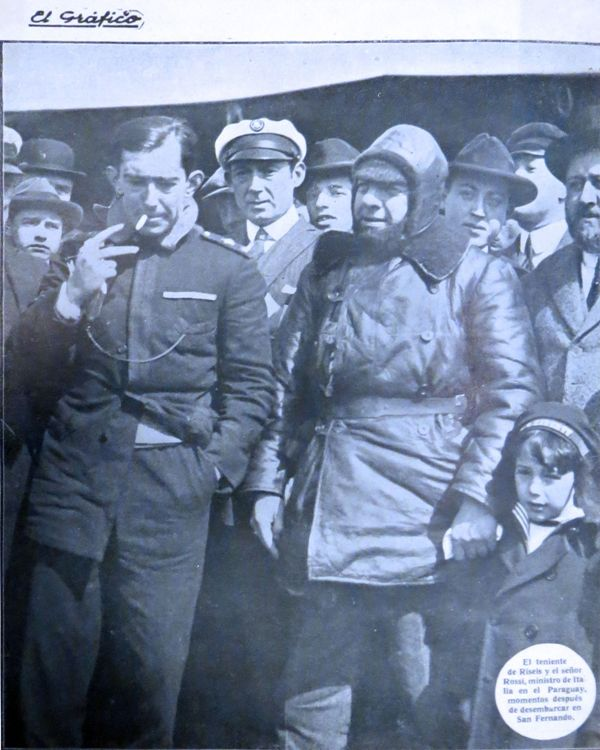
Adolfo Rossi (right) and Luigi de Riseis (left) embarking for the return flight of the first-ever flight between Buenos Aires and Asunción.

In 1912, he was transferred to Rosario, Argentina, and eventually as head of the Italian mission – first in Asunción in Paraguay (1914) and later in January 1921 to Buenos Aires, Argentina. In Rosario he again undertook an inspection to investigate the working conditions of Italian immigrants who had flocked to Argentina during the great European immigration wave to Argentina. He journeyed through the provinces of Santa Fe, Corrientes, and Chaco. The report painted the image that the first Italian settlers and their sons "were in a paradise, the renters of land in a purgatory, and the lot of the newest immigrants, struggling against debt and privation, was an inferno."

While serving as consul in Paraguay, he facilitated the first-ever flight between Buenos Aires, the capital of Argentina, and Asunción, the capital of Paraguay, on 15 August 1919. The flight was carried out by Italian Royal Navy pilot Luigi de Riseis in a two-seat floatplane manufactured by Macchi (a "Lonner 3" hydroplane), as part of an Italian military aviation mission aimed at promoting Italian aeronautical culture and industry in South America. Seizing the opportunity to experience this groundbreaking event firsthand, Rossi donned appropriate flight gear, posed for photographs, and joined the young pilot as a passenger on the return flight from Asunción to Buenos Aires.

Despite the honorary titles and positions he earned over the years, Rossi remained a modest and unassuming man. In 1921, for example, Italians in Buenos Aires could still see him stepping off the tram like any other working man. Only six months after his appointment as Consul general and Minister Plenipotentiary in Argentina, he died unexpectedly from a stroke on 28 July 1921 in Buenos Aires. His remains were repatriated and, on 22 September, laid to rest in the municipal cemetery of Lendinara, beside the graves of his mentor Alberto Mario and Alberto's wife, the writer Jessie White Mario. He had been married to Elvira Carpentieri in 1884 when he returned from New York to Rome, and had six children: Giuseppe (1889), Annita (1891), Amerigo (1892), Roberto (1894), Livia (1897) and Vincenzo (1899).

== Legacy ==
As a journalist, Adolfo Rossi brought significant stylistic and methodological innovations to Italian journalism, becoming one of the most widely read correspondents of his era. He helped modernize the profession and elevate the standing of traveling reporters – early examples of today's field journalists – who were often regarded as inferior to newsroom-based colleagues valued more for their refined prose than for investigative skill. Rossi's writing was concise and direct, prioritizing clarity while vividly portraying events, places, and people with remarkable descriptive ability. His reports and recommendations as an emigration inspector on the conditions of Italian migrants in Brazil, South Africa, the United States, and Argentina – accurate, unflinching, and almost photographic in detail – caused a public stir and played a significant role in reshaping migration policy in Rome.

== Publications ==
- Rossi, Adolfo (1891). Vita d'America (in Italian). Rome: Edoardo Perino Edit.
- — (1892). Un italiano in America (in Italian) (1899 ed.). Milan: Fratelli Treves Edit.
- — (1893). Nel paese dei dollari: tre anni in America (in Italian). Milan: Max Kantorowicz Edit.
- — (1893b). Da Napoli ad Amburgo. Escursioni di un giornalista (in Italian). Rome: Stabilimento tipografico La Tribuna.
- — (1893c). Bellucci, Giuseppe (ed.). Nel regno di Tiburzi, ovvero scene del brigantaggio nella campagna romana (in Italian) (Viterbo: Archeoares 2018 ed.). Rome: Peroni. ISBN 978-88-99822-31-6.
- — (1894). L'agitazione in Sicilia. Inchiesta sui Fasci dei lavoratori (in Italian). Milan: Max Kantorowicz Edit. (Translated into German: Die Bewegung in Sizilien: Im Hinblick auf die letzten Verurtheilungen (in German). Stuttgart: Dietz. 1894.
- — (1894b). L'Eritrea com'è oggi. Impressioni di un viaggio dopo la battaglia di Agordat (in Italian). Rome: Voghera. (Brief description on Biblethiophile: En savoir plus in French)
- — (1895). Le nostre conquiste in Africa. Impressioni e note di un secondo viaggio fatto durante l'occupazione di Agamè (in Italian). Milan: Max Kantorowicz Edit.
- — (1895). Menelik e l'Italia: cronaca documentata (in Italian). Milan: Max Kantorowicz Edit.
- — (1896). Un'escursione nel Montenegro (in Italian). Milan: Carlo Aliprandi Editore.
- — (1897). Alla Guerra Greco-Turca (aprile-maggio 1897). Impressioni ed istantanee di un corrispondente (in Italian). Florence: R. Bemporad & Figli.
- — (1899). Da Costantinopoli a Madrid. Impressioni di un corrispondente (in Italian). Catania: Niccolo Giannotta Edit.
- — (1900). Inglesi e Boeri. 1900 Attraverso l'Africa Australe e il Transvaal (in Italian). Milan: Fratelli Treves Edit.
- Rossi, Adolfo (1900b). L'oro e le spine dell'Eritrea (in Italian). Milan: Tipografia di G. B. Carlini. (text of a lecture given in Genoa on February 2, 1900)
- — (1908b). Da Tiburzi a Musolino. New York: Francesco Tocci. (Review)
- — (2010). Romanato, Gianpaolo (ed.). L'Italia della vergogna nelle cronache di Adolfo Rossi (1857–1921) (in Italian). Ravenna: Angelo Longo Editore. ISBN 978-88-8063-658-8. (Review in Italian)
- — (2016). Nel regno di Musolino (in Italian). Soveria Mannelli (CZ): Rubbettino. ISBN 978-88-498-4574-7. (Compilation of a series of twenty articles – most published under the title 'Nel regno di Musolino' – about Giuseppe Musolino for the Venetian newspaper L'Adriatico in 1901 with a preface and afterword by John Dickie and Fabio Truzzolillo)

=== Reports for the General Commissariat of Emigration ===
- Rossi, Adolfo (1902). "Condizioni dei coloni italiani nello stato di San Paolo (Brasile). Relazione e diarii del cav. Adolfo Rossi sulla missione da lui compiuta dal 2 gennaio al 23 aprile 1902". Bollettino dell'emigrazione (in Italian) (7). Commissariato Generale dell'Emigrazione: 3–87.
- — (1903). "Le questioni del lavoro nell'Africa del Sud. Lettere dell'ispettore cav. Adolfo Rossi scrìtte al Commissariato nel corso della sua missione nelle Colonie del Capo, del Transvaal e del Natal". Bollettino dell'emigrazione (in Italian) (9). Commissariato Generale dell'Emigrazione: 3–104.
- — (1904). "Per la tutela degli italiani negli Stati Uniti. Lettere dell'ispettore cav. Adolfo Rossi, scritte al Commissariato dell'emigrazione nel corso di una sua missione negli Stati Uniti dell'America del Nord". Bollettino dell'emigrazione (in Italian) (16). Commissariato Generale dell'Emigrazione: 3–136.
- — (1908). "Vantaggi e danni dell'emigrazione nel mezzogiorno d'Italia. Note di un viaggio fato in Basilicata e in Calabria dal R. Commissario del'emigrazione Adolfo Rossi". Bollettino dell'emigrazione (in Italian) (13). Commissariato Generale dell'Emigrazione: 3–99.
- — (1914). "Note e impressioni di un viaggio nel distretto consolare di Rosario (Argentina)". Bollettino dell'emigrazione (in Italian) (4). Commissariato Generale dell'Emigrazione: 5–72.
- — (2020). Cappelli, Vittorio (ed.). L'emigrazione nel Mezzogiorno d'Italia. Un viaggio-inchiesta in Basilicata e in Calabria 1907 (Istituto e del Centro di Ricerca sulle Migrazioni) (in Italian). Cosenza: Pellegrini. ISBN 978-88-6822-910-8. (Re-issue of the report in the Bollettino dell'emigrazione, 1908 (13))

== Sources ==
- Bagatin, Pier Luigi; Contegiacomo, Luigi (2021). Il Polesine di Matteotti: Le inchieste giornalistiche di Adolfo Rossi e Jessie White (PDF) (in Italian). Verona: Cierre edizioni. ISBN 978-88-5520-118-6.
- Balbinot, Giovani (2018). "Detratoes e defensores da imigração italiana para o Brasil: o Decreto Prinetti de 1902 e a Exposição Mundial de 1906". Saeculum – Revista de História (in Portuguese). 38 (38): 205–227. doi:10.22478/ufpb.2317-6725.2018v38n38.32739.
- Bonsaver, Guido (2024). America in Italian Culture: The Rise of a New Model of Modernity, 1861-1943. Oxford University Press. ISBN 978-0-19-884946-9.
- Choate, Mark I. (2008). Emigrant Nation: The Making of Italy Abroad. Cambridge, MA: Harvard University Press. ISBN 978-0-674-02784-8.
- Cinel, Dino (1982). From Italy to San Francisco: The Immigrant Experience. Stanford, CA: Stanford University Press. ISBN 0-8047-1117-8.
- Colajanni, Napoleone (1895). Gli avvenimenti di Sicila e le loro cause (in Italian). Palermo: Remo Sandron Editore.
- Dickie, John (2004). Cosa Nostra. A history of the Sicilian Mafia. London: Hodder & Stoughton. ISBN 0-340-82435-2.
- Dickie, John (2011). Mafia Brotherhoods: Camorra, Mafia, 'Ndrangheta. The Rise of the Honoured Societies. London: Hodder & Stoughton. ISBN 978-0-340-96394-4.
- Durante, Francesco, ed. (2014). Italoamericana: The Literature of the Great Migration, 1880-1943. New York: Fordham University Press. ISBN 978-0-8232-6062-1.
- Foerster, Robert F. (1919). The Italian emigration of our times. Cambridge: Harvard University Press.
- Papa, Dario; Fontana, Ferdinando (1884). New-York (in Italian). Milan: Giuseppe Galli.
- Romanato, Gianpaolo (2015). "Le molte vite di Adolfo Rossi: Emigrante, giornalista, ispettore, diplomático" [The Many Lives of Adolfo Rossi: Emigrant, Journalist, Inspector, Diplomat] (PDF). Zibaldone: Estudios Italianos de la Torre del Virrey (in Italian). 3 (1): 111-121. ISSN 2255-3576.
- Soresina, Marco (2016). "Italian emigration policy during the Great Migration Age, 1888–1919: the interaction of emigration and foreign policy". Journal of Modern Italian Studies. 21 (5): 723–746. doi:10.1080/1354571X.2016.1242260.
- Trento, Angelo (1989). Do outro lado do Atlântico: um século de imigração italiana no Brasil (in Portuguese). São Paulo: Livraria Nobel. ISBN 85-213-0563-X.
