= Report to the Commissioner =

1975 film by Milton Katselas

- Theatrical release poster by Tom Jung
- Directed by: Milton Katselas
- Screenplay by: Abby Mann; Ernest Tidyman
- Based on: Report to the Commissioner by James Mills
- Produced by: M.J. Frankovich
- Starring: Michael Moriarty; Yaphet Kotto; Susan Blakely; Héctor Elizondo; Tony King
- Cinematography: Mario Tosi
- Edited by: David Blewitt
- Music by: Elmer Bernstein
- Production company: Frankovich Productions
- Distributed by: United Artists
- Release date: February 5, 1975
- Running time: 112 minutes
- Country: United States
- Language: English

Report to the Commissioner is a 1975 American crime drama film based on James Mills' 1972 novel. It involves a rookie cop (Michael Moriarty) in the New York City Police Department who is assigned a special missing person case, which in fact is meant to be a wild-goose chase to back up an undercover female police officer's role as the girlfriend of a drug dealer.

The film was directed by Milton Katselas and features a musical score by Elmer Bernstein. The script is by two Oscar-winning screenwriters, Abby Mann (Judgment at Nuremberg) and Ernest Tidyman (The French Connection). It marked Richard Gere's film debut.

== Plot ==
Beauregard "Bo" Lockley, long-haired and thoughtful, is a new type of undercover detective in the New York City Police Department. He is assigned to find a missing young woman, but he is not told she is actually an undercover officer whose latest assignment is to get close to a heroin dealer, Thomas "Stick" Henderson with links to political radicals; the department has long been after Stick.

Lockley trails her to a disco with the help of Joey. Frustrated by Lockley's presence, as it jeopardizes her assignment, she arranges to meet with Lockley the following morning. However, when she misses the appointment, he goes to where she and Henderson are living, and in the confused shoot-out that follows, Lockley accidentally shoots her dead.

Lockley chases Henderson through the streets and into the Saks Fifth Avenue department store, and the two end up trapped in an elevator between floors, holding guns on each other. The two men bond during the fruitless negotiations that follow. They eventually agree to try to exit the elevator car through the trapdoor in its ceiling. However, the entire area is surrounded by heavily armed police, who shoot Henderson, killing him.

Lockley's and the policewoman's superior officers, determined to save their careers, scramble to come up with a story that would be minimally embarrassing to the department. They claim that Lockley, the woman and the dealer were involved in a lovers’ triangle and that Lockley shot her out of jealousy.

While Lockley is rung up on a first degree murder charge, his partner, Richard "Crunch" Blackstone, visits him while he is awaiting trial at "The Tombs." Later, and without Lockley or his partner's knowledge, police leadership decides to shuffle the offending detectives around and drop the charges. When deciding whether or not Lockley will be let back on the force, one member of leadership says "We'll see." Crunch goes back to jail to break the good news to him, only to find that Lockley has hanged himself from the jail cell bars.

A final voice over reports that Lockley was found dead in his cell at 8:55 PM, hanged with a noose made out of a torn bedsheet.

== Cast ==
- Michael Moriarty – Bo Lockley
- Yaphet Kotto – Richard "Crunch" Blackstone
- Susan Blakely – Patty Butler
- Héctor Elizondo – Captain D'Angelo
- Tony King – Thomas "Stick" Henderson
- Michael McGuire – Lt. Hanson
- Edward Grover – Captain Strichter
- Dana Elcar – Chief Perna
- Bob Balaban – Joey Egan (as Robert Balaban)
- William Devane – Asst. D.A. Jackson
- Stephen Elliott – Police Commissioner
- Richard Gere – Billy
- Vic Tayback – Lt. Seidensticker
- Albert Seedman – Detective Schulman
- Mark Margolis – Bartender (uncredited)
- Noelle North – Samantha

== Reception ==
The film received mixed reviews from critics. On the review aggregator website Rotten Tomatoes, 57% of 46 critics' reviews are positive. The website's consensus reads: "Report to the Commissioner presents some compelling performances and atmospherically gritty cinematography, but its central story of police corruption becomes overwrought and contrived."

== See also ==
- List of American films of 1975
