= Stefano Miceli =

Italian musician

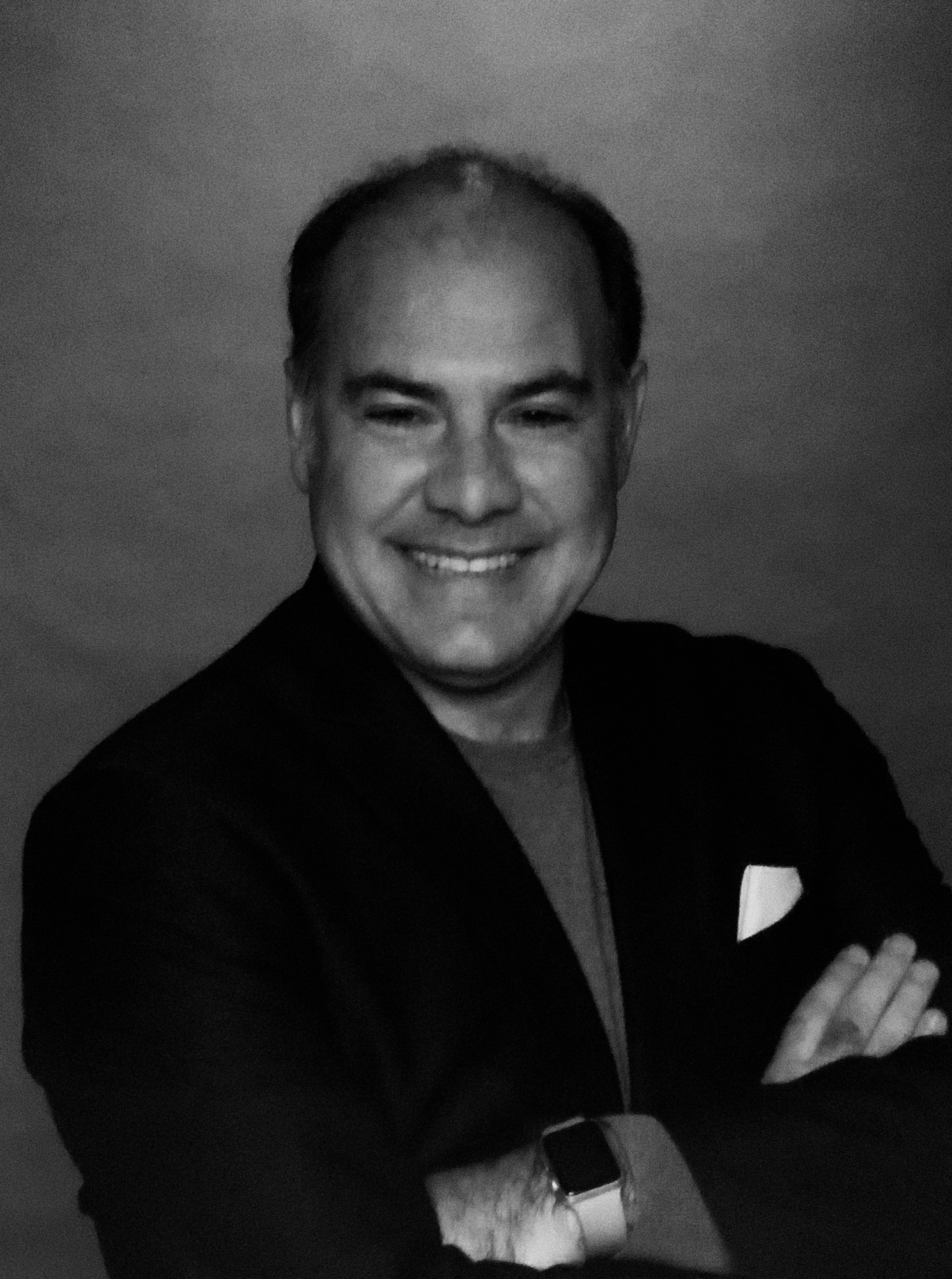
Stefano Miceli

Stefano Miceli OMRI (born 14 April 1975) is an Italian classical conductor and pianist.

== Biography ==
Stefano Miceli has appeared as a conductor, pianist and regular guest artist at festivals and theaters around the world, including Carnegie Hall, Sydney Opera House, Leipzig Gewandhaus, Berliner Philharmonie, Fenice Venice Opera House, Beijing's Forbidden City Concert Hall, Donizetti Opera Bergamo, Boston Theatre, Melbourne Arts Center, Bellini Opera Catania, and festivals in Tbilisi, Bangkok, Saigon, Hanoi, Milan, Rome, Napoli, Lugano, Washington, and New Orleans.

Miceli has led many orchestras including the Salzburg Orchestra, Leipzig Philharmonic, Chamber Orchestra of La Scala, La Fenice Orchestra of Venice, European Symphony Orchestra, Orchestra Victoria, Beijing Symphony Orchestra, Milano Metropolitan Orchestra, Orchestra of Cluje, Bangkok Symphony, Slovak Philharmonic, Dallas Virtuosi Chamber Orchestra, Las Cruces Symphony Orchestra, Orchestra Sinfonica Italiana, Saigon Opera House Orchestra, El Sistema orchestras, "Pomeriggi Musicali" Milan Symphony, Moldova Philharmonic and many others.

He has been the principal guest artist of the Cameristi della Fenice (Venice Opera House chamber orchestra), Principal Guest Artist and Conductor of the Leipzig Philharmonic Orchestra at the Gewandhaus, Leipzig (Germany) and Conductor-in-Residence of the Orchestra Sinfonica Italiana.

In November 2010 Stefano Miceli made his New York debut as a soloist and conductor at Carnegie Hall with stirring performances of his Piazzolla’s Four Seasons’ arrangement for piano and orchestra and Wagner and Rossini masterpieces.

In addition to his performing career Miceli is dedicated to the promulgation of classical education and talent. He has served as visiting professor at the Boston University, University of New Mexico, Manhattan College, University of Nebraska, California State University Los Angeles, HCMC Conservatory of Music and Hanoi National Academy in Vietnam, Bangkok University, "J.S. Bach" Music School in Leipzig, Melbourne Conservatory of Music, El Sistema Music Schools in Venezuela, National Academy of Arts in Malta, and Steinway Academy Verona, Italy. He devotes part of his time to serve as Conducting and Orchestration Professor at Adelphi University, New York and as a piano professor and Director at the Long Island Music Conservatory, NY.

Stefano Miceli is also the founder and Director at the International Summer Piano Camp of Italy "Brindisi Camp" in Brindisi, Italy.

Miceli is the recipient of the Union League of New York's 2016 And 2019 Abraham Lincoln Medal (NYC), the Italian Academy's 2012 "Bravo! Award" (NYC), and the Silver Medal from the President of the Republic of Italy (2008, Rome, Italy) for his performances in Italy and for his dedication to education. In December 2018 Miceli was given the "2018 Award of Excellence in Performing Arts" by the American Society of Friends of Teatro Alla Scala.

In 2015 Miceli has accompanied the President of Italy, Sergio Mattarella, to Vietnam and has conducted the Saigon Opera House Philharmonic triumphantly to mark the official opening of The cultural cooperation program between Italy and Vietnam.

Stefano Miceli is an advisory board member at the Phoenicia Festival of the Voice, New York and founder and director of the Greenwich Piano Institute in Greenwich in United States.

Since 2011 Stefano Miceli has been a Steinway Artist (Hamburg Department).

In 2022-23 Stefano Miceli has been the chairman of the board of trustees of the Nuovo Teatro Verdi in Brindisi and founder and music director of the resident orchestra.

In June 2023 Stefano Miceli was appointed Cavaliere dell'Ordine al Merito della Repubblica Italiana by the President of the Republic of Italy Sergio Mattarella.

Stefano Miceli lives in New York City.
