= The Panic in Needle Park =

1971 American film by Jerry Schatzberg

The Panic In Needle Park
- Original poster (with Ontario Censor Board classification)
- Directed by: Jerry Schatzberg
- Screenplay by: Joan Didion; John Gregory Dunne
- Based on: The Panic in Needle Park; 1966 novel by James Mills
- Produced by: Dominick Dunne
- Starring: Al Pacino; Kitty Winn; Alan Vint; Richard Bright; Raúl Juliá; Kiel Martin; Paul Sorvino
- Cinematography: Adam Holender
- Edited by: Evan A. Lottman
- Production companies: Gadd Productions Corp. Didion-Dunne
- Distributed by: 20th Century-Fox
- Release date: July 13, 1971
- Running time: 110 minutes
- Country: United States
- Language: English
- Budget: $1.6 million

The Panic in Needle Park is a 1971 American drama film directed by Jerry Schatzberg and starring Al Pacino (in his first lead role) and Kitty Winn. The screenplay is written by Joan Didion and John Gregory Dunne, adapted from the 1966 novel by James Mills.

The film portrays life among a group of heroin addicts who hang out in "Needle Park" (a nickname at that time for the Verdi Square–Sherman Square area of Manhattan's Upper West Side). The film is a love story between Bobby (Pacino), a young addict and small-time hustler, and Helen (Kitty Winn), a restless woman who thinks Bobby is charismatic. She becomes an addict, and life goes downhill for them as their addictions worsen, eventually leading to a series of betrayals.

== Plot ==
In New York City, Helen returns to the apartment that she shares with her boyfriend Marco after an unhygienic and inept abortion. Helen becomes ill, and Bobby, an amiable small-time drug dealer to whom Marco owes money, shows gentleness and concern for her. When Marco leaves, Helen considers returning to her family, but instead moves in with Bobby. When she finds him taking drugs, he explains that he's "only chipping." At Sherman Square and Verdi Square—nicknamed "Needle Park" because addicts trade and use drugs there—Bobby introduces Helen to acquaintances, including his brother Hank, who burgles for a living. Helen witnesses the intricate ritual of addicts shooting up heroin.

Bobby and Helen are evicted and move into a sleazier building. After Bobby asks her to buy his heroin, Helen and the dealer Freddie are arrested by Detective Hotch. Hotch asks Helen, "Bobby's got you scoring for him already, huh?", implying that this is habitual for Bobby's girlfriends. He describes a "panic" in Needle Park, i.e., when the heroin supply is low and prices are high, addicts turn on each other, often turning in each other to the police, in return for favors. Hotch releases Helen, and she returns to Bobby, who begins to use drugs more heavily. Helen eventually begins to shoot up as well.

Bobby realizes that Helen is using and proposes marriage. Hank asks what they will live on and offers work to Bobby as a burglar, to which Helen objects, insisting that she will get a job. However, she quits her waitressing after muddling some orders. Before Bobby is to assist Hank in a burglary, he overdoses. Hank is angry with Bobby but gives him another opportunity, during which Bobby is arrested. While he is in jail, Helen finds it harder to get drugs and ends up having sex with Hank. When Bobby is released, he viciously beats Helen.

Bobby persuades Santo, a major dealer, to let him handle distribution in Needle Park, while Helen turns to prostitution for money. The addicts welcome Bobby as a reliable source. Helen's health deteriorates from drug use, her relationship with Bobby suffers, and Hotch monitors her. After Helen and one of her customers are detained, Hotch asks the arresting officer to free her, for he needs her.

Helen's mother invites her to meet visiting family friends. Reluctantly, Helen agrees, dressing carefully to hide the track marks on her arms. Instead of attending, though, she picks up a customer, who Bobby chases away. Realizing that they have been through a lot, the couple takes the Staten Island Ferry to the "country" to buy a puppy. The two discuss the prospect of leaving Needle Park, to which Bobby replies that is "where I live," indicating the binding ties he has to the locale and lifestyle of Needle Park. While on the boat back, they discuss moving away for a fresh start, but Bobby refuses and convinces Helen to shoot up in the men's room. When the puppy whines, Bobby puts it outside, but when Helen looks for it, she watches as it falls into the water.

Helen visits Marco but soon returns to Bobby to steal his drugs. Needing to get high, Helen tells a doctor that she needs drugs for pain. Aware that she is addicted, the doctor provides samples and tells her never to return. Arrested for selling her excess pills to children, she is warned by Hotch about the dangers of the women's prison. Knowing that Bobby can lead them to Santo, he offers Helen a deal if she will help them to catch Bobby picking up a shipment.

Over the next fortnight, Hotch approaches Helen several times, reminding her of her pending trial. Depressed, she increases her drug use but finally agrees. One night, Helen and Hotch watch Bobby, who has a large amount of heroin, apprehended. When he spots her, he yells. On his release, Helen waits for him at the gate. Although his impulse is to rebuff her, they walk away together.

== Cast ==
- Al Pacino as Bobby
- Kitty Winn as Helen Reeves
- Alan Vint as Detective Hotch
- Richard Bright as Hank
- Kiel Martin as Chico
- Michael McClanathan as Sonny
- Warren Finnerty as Sammy
- Marcia Jean Kurtz as Marcie
- Raul Julia as Marco
- Angie Ortega as Irene
- Larry Marshall as Mickey
- Paul Mace as Whitey
- Nancy MacKay as Penny
- Gil Rogers as Robins
- Joe Santos as Detective DiBono
- Paul Sorvino as Samuels
- Arnold Williams as Freddy
- Sully Boyar as Doctor
- Ruth Alda as Admitting Nurse

== Production ==
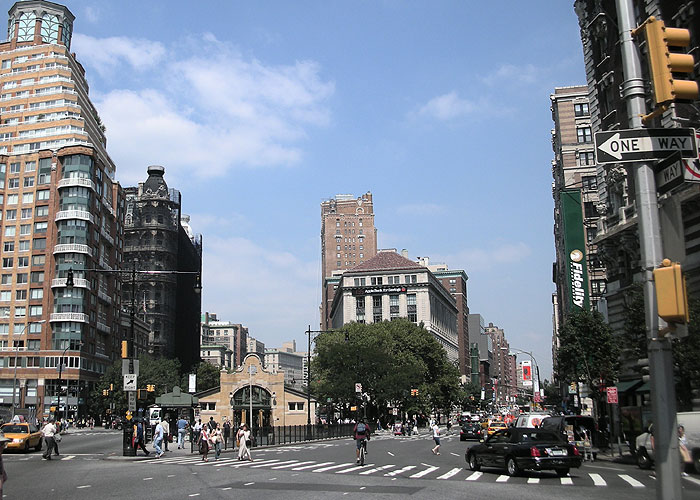
Looking northward on Broadway toward 72nd Street in Verdi Square, New York City. The New York City Subway's 72nd Street station house can be seen at left.

The film is based on a novel by James Mills, which had been based on Mills's two-part pictorial essay in the February 26 and March 5, 1965, issues of Life magazine. According to a November 1967 Hollywood Reporter news item, film rights for the novel were purchased by Avco Embassy Pictures and, according to a March 1969 Variety news item, the film rights were bought by producer Dominick Dunne, whose brother and sister-in-law, John Gregory Dunne and Joan Didion, wrote the screenplay.

As noted in the onscreen credits, the film was shot entirely in New York City. According to the film's studio production notes, portions were shot at Sherman Square and the Upper West Side area of New York City, at Riverside Park, in a New York City prison and hospital ward, on the Staten Island Ferry, and in the East Village. The studio notes report that makeup man Herman Buchman studied the track marks on the arms of hospital patients and victims in morgues and achieved an authentic look for the actors by using a liquid known as flexible collodion. In scenes in which actors appear to inject themselves, a registered nurse was on set, serving as a technical advisor.

Ned Rorem was to compose the film's score until it was decided that no music would be used (his isolated and unused score is included as a special feature on the Blu-ray). Much of the film features cinéma vérité-style footage. It is believed to be the first mainstream film to feature actual drug injection.

Didion and Dunne visited Jim Morrison, lead singer of the Doors, during the recording of the album Waiting for the Sun, as he was being considered for the role of Bobby.

== Release ==
On its release in 1971, some European film boards, such as in Germany, gave the film an "X" rating for its harsh and realistic view of drug use and violence; it was banned completely in the UK until 1974. Many of these boards' decisions were made due to aspects of the film that are not necessarily pornographic (as was the case with other significant works, such as Hodges's Get Carter, Peckinpah's Straw Dogs, Kubrick's A Clockwork Orange (all from 1971) and Boorman's Deliverance (1972)). The early 1970s are therefore often cited to be the significant phase of X-rated movies that were not necessarily pornographic.

The Panic in Needle Park marks Al Pacino's first starring feature film role, although it was neither his nor Kitty Winn's feature film debut, as the studio notes and some reviews erroneously reported. It was Raul Julia's first feature film.

=== Home media ===
The film was released on Blu-ray through Twilight Time on June 14, 2016, in their usual limitation of producing only 3,000 copies.

== Reception ==
On Rotten Tomatoes, the film has an approval rating of 80%, based on 15 reviews, with a weighted average of 7.2/10.

Roger Ebert of the Chicago Sun-Times gave the film 3½ stars out of 4, and wrote that "the movie lives and moves. It is not filled with quick cutting or gimmicky editing, but Jerry Schatzberg's direction is so confident that we cover the ground effortlessly. We meet the characters, we get to know the world. Especially, we get to know this relationship between Bobby and Helen, and thank God the filmmakers were tasteful enough not to kill them off at the end just because that's so fashionable these days."

Roger Greenspun of The New York Times stated in a more mixed review that the film "vacillates between expressive slice-of-life and some of the less durable minor conventions of big-city melodrama".

Arthur D. Murphy of Variety lauded the film as "a total triumph. Gritty, gutsy, compelling, and vivid to the point of revulsion yet so artistically perfect one cannot look away, it is an overpowering tragedy about urban drug addiction."

Gene Siskel of the Chicago Tribune gave the film 2 stars out of 4, and wrote, "Despite its many closeups of needles puncturing veins, 'Panic' is little more than a traditional love story set in New York's West Side drug culture ... The film is neither an especially interesting drama nor an effective antidrug film. I think director Jerry Schatzberg would like it to be both."

Charles Champlin of the Los Angeles Times said that it "is the latest of the drug movies. It is also, I think, the best of them. But if it's a peak, it's also a dead end—that is, it both defines and exhausts the possibilities of the movie which contents itself with describing (however accurately and horrifyingly) the drug milieu and does not choose to go beyond surfaces to causes."

Gary Arnold of The Washington Post wrote, "Whatever social value The Panic in Needle Park aspired to is effectively canceled by its lack of dramatic interest. This is one of those movies that never seems to get off the low burner."

Stanley Kauffmann of The New Republic described Panic in Needle Park as "rotten".

== Awards ==
For her portrayal of Helen, Winn won the Best Actress Award at the 1971 Cannes Film Festival. The film and its director, Jerry Schatzberg, were also nominated for the Palme d'Or.

== See also ==
- List of American films of 1971
- Requiem for a Dream (2000), a thematically similar film
