= Sherman Square =

Public space in Manhattan, New York

Coordinates: 40°46′38″N 73°58′56″W

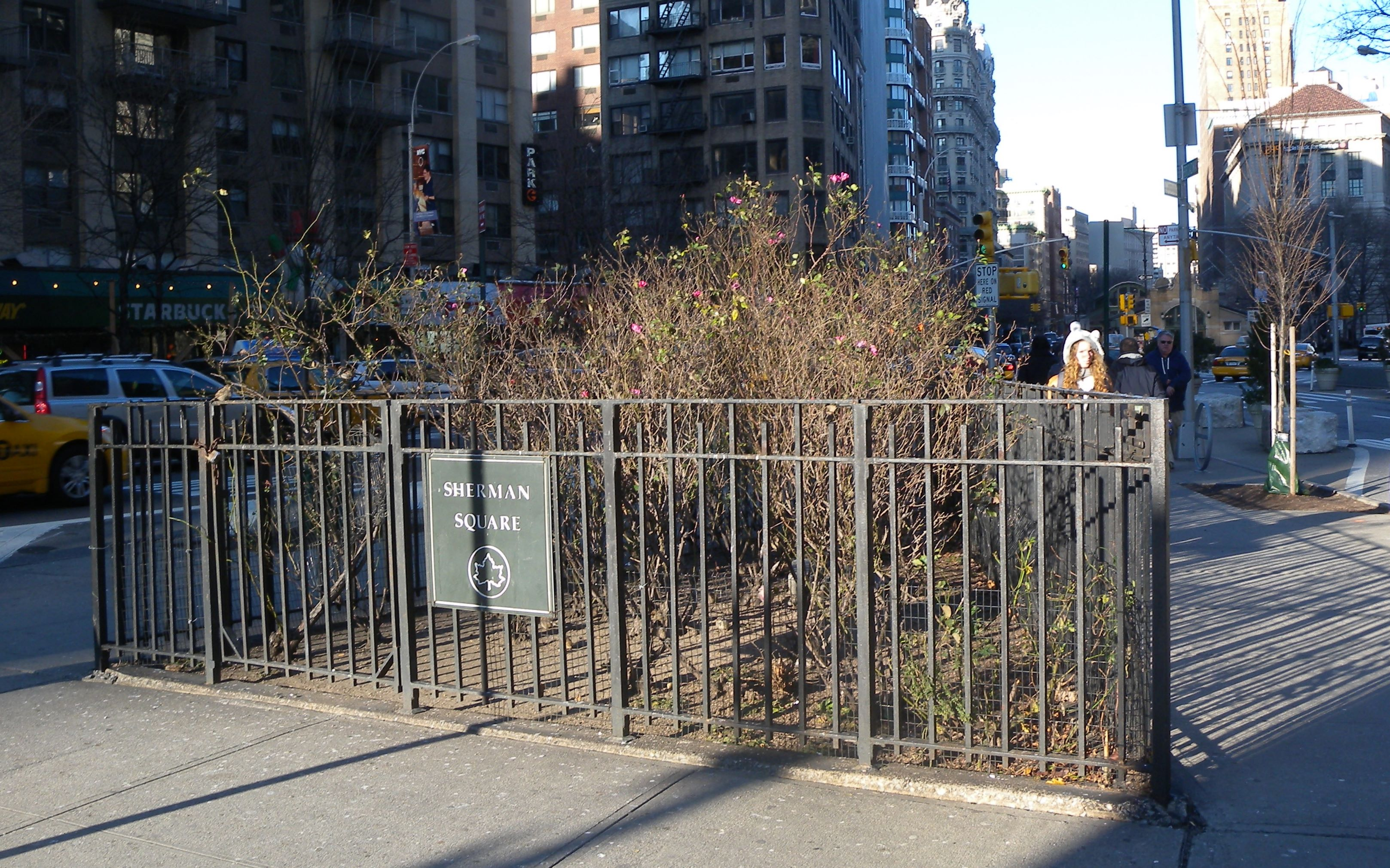
Sherman Square

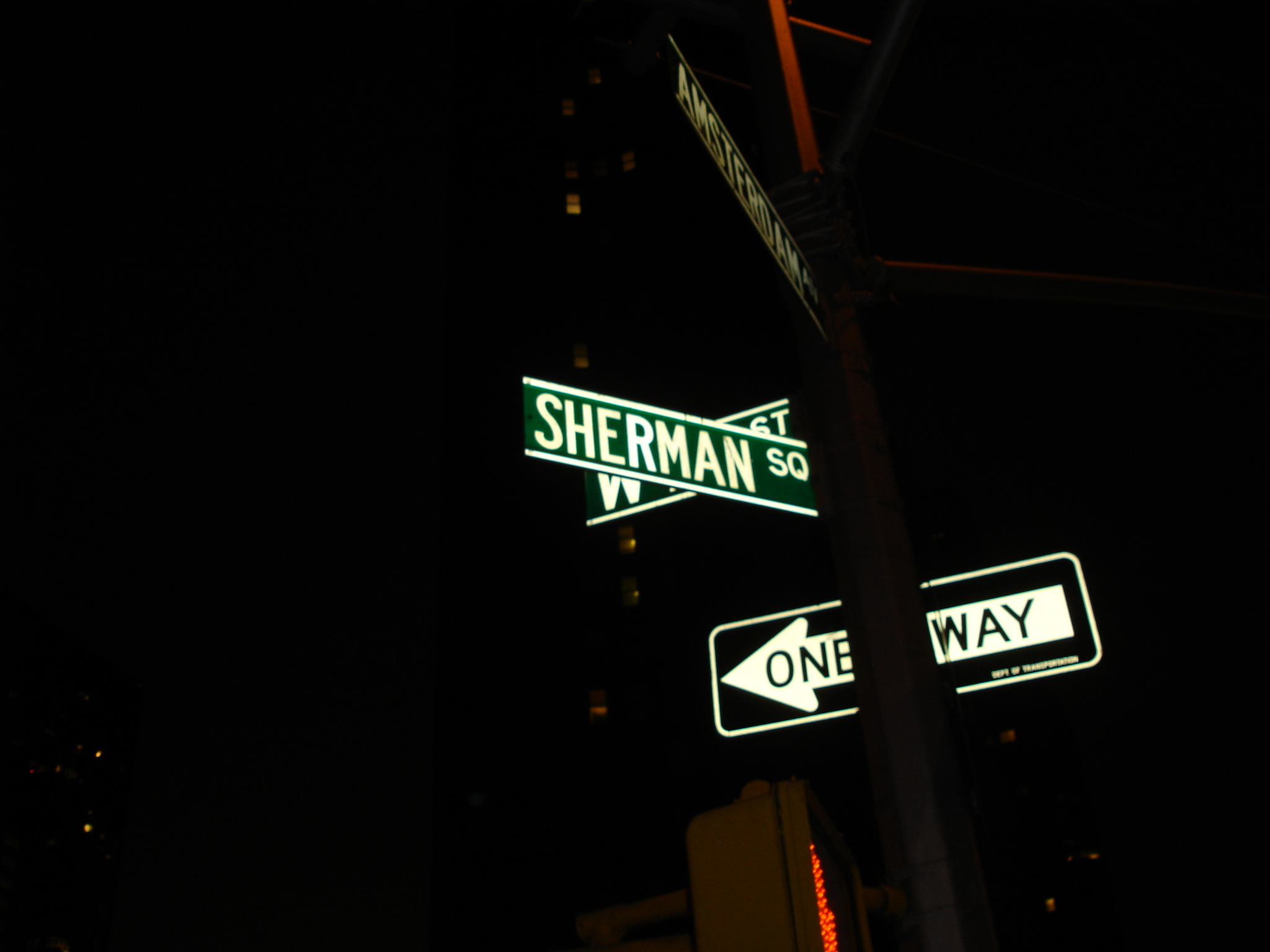
Street sign

Sherman Square is a pocket park bounded by Broadway, Amsterdam Avenue, and West 70th Street on the Upper West Side of Manhattan, in New York City. It was named in 1891 for William Tecumseh Sherman who lived in the area and died that year.

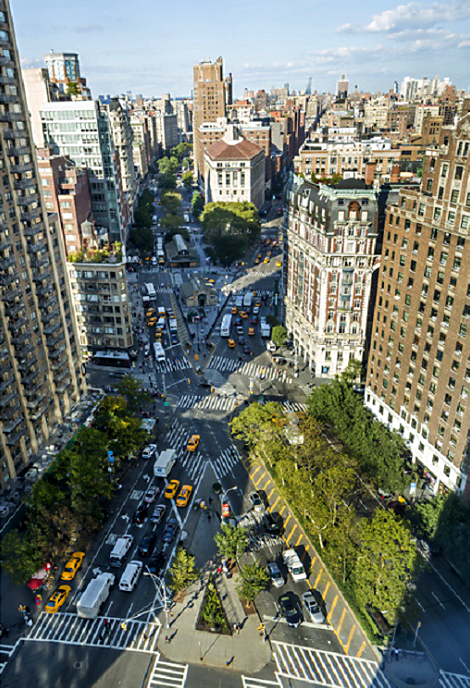
View of Sherman Square (at bottom of picture) facing north

The park name is used to describe the neighborhood surrounding the entrances to the 72nd Street station, which are on traffic islands where Broadway and Amsterdam Avenue cross.

The Sherman Square area, and its much bigger neighbor Verdi Square, on the north side of 72nd, were dubbed “Needle Park” in the 1960s and 1970s because of illicit drug activity. This provided the title and general setting for the 1966 book by James Mills and its 1971 film adaptation The Panic in Needle Park, directed by Jerry Schatzberg and starring Al Pacino in his second role.

The fenced-in portion of Sherman Square protecting its vegetation is only 264 sq ft (24.5 m^{2}) and is actually a scalene triangle. It is on a paved, much larger triangle. The fenced area has 17 ft (5.2 m) facing 70th Street, 35 ft (11 m) facing Broadway, and 30 ft (9.1 m) facing Amsterdam.

The name of squares for triangular pieces of land reflected the original Commissioners' Plan of 1811 which called for the area to be built according to a master grid. New York City acquired the land by condemnation in 1849 when Broadway was being built through the area at an angle and was not on the grid. Other parcels of land on Broadway that have the square name but are irregular pieces of land include Herald Square and Times Square.

The park’s size diminished in 1869 when 70th Street was built.

== See also ==
- List of New York City parks
