= Il Progresso Italo-Americano =

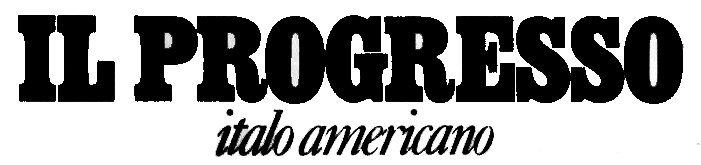
- Type: Daily newspaper
- Owner(s): Carlo Barsotti; Generoso Pope
- Founded: 1880; 146 years ago
- Ceased publication: 1988
- Headquarters: New York City, New York, United States

Il Progresso Italo-Americano was an Italian-language daily newspaper in the United States, published in New York City from 1880 to 1988, when it was shut down due to a union dispute. In 1989, most journalists of Il Progresso reunited to create a new daily, America Oggi. In the early 20th century Il Progresso was the most popular of New York's Italian newspapers, selling anywhere from 90,000 to 100,000 copies every day.

== Foundation and early years ==
In September 1880, Carlo Barsotti, along with Vincenzo Polidori, founded Il Progresso Italo-Americano in New York City – the first Italian-language daily newspaper in the United States. Its inaugural issue was published on September 29, 1880. The paper quickly grew to become the most widely circulated foreign-language newspaper in the city.

Il Progresso was established as a direct challenge to Giovanni Francesco Secchi de Casali’s weekly L'Eco d'Italia. De Casali had dismissed Barsotti's reports on the efforts of an Italian American committee formed in response to the 1880 death sentence of Pietro Balbo, convicted of murdering his wife. Frustrated that the only Italian newspaper in New York showed no concern for the fate of a compatriot facing execution, Barsotti resolved to create a more engaged and outspoken daily. In its earliest form, the newspaper was literally "run by hand." It began as a short, handwritten report in Italian on the Pietro Balbo trial, written with a fountain pen and posted outside Barsotti’s shop near Mulberry Street. So many people gathered to read it that Barsotti began producing multiple handwritten copies, which he sold to the growing audience.

To manage the paper's operations, Barsotti hired Adolfo Rossi, a recent immigrant from Italy with no prior experience in journalism. Despite his inexperience, Rossi proved highly capable and helped turn Il Progresso into a thriving publication as its editor-in-chief. Rossi assumed the role of editor-in-chief on December 6, 1880. After a brief one-day interruption, the paper reappeared on December 23 with a new title, Il Progresso Italo-Americano, along with a redesigned format and masthead. It would retain this name until 1988, when America Oggi took up its legacy. At the time, New York’s Italian community numbered around 25,000, many of whom were illiterate. Nonetheless, the newspaper managed to survive, largely sustained by advertising revenue.

Rossi, hired as a jack-of-all-trades, worked from 9 a.m. to midnight, serving as both editor and sole correspondent. He faced numerous challenges: a minimal staff, printers unfamiliar with Italian who introduced frequent errors, and the logistical hurdles of daily production. Rossi translated local news from English, adapted content from Italian sources, proofread each edition, and handled the layout. He later recounted these early, chaotic days in his 1892 memoir, Un italiano in America (An Italian in America). The newspaper consisted of four pages: two were entirely devoted to advertisements, while the remaining two focused on news from Italy. The front page featured the latest transatlantic dispatches, translated from English, alongside a brief editorial and a summary of American news.

== Later years ==
Il Progresso was a bully pulpit for raising funds for monuments by public subscription in the city of New York. From 1888 to 1921 it promoted monuments to Giuseppe Garibaldi, Christopher Columbus, Giuseppe Verdi, Giovanni da Verrazzano and Dante.

After Barsotti's death, Generoso Pope assumed the direction of the newspaper in 1928, after buying it for $2,052,000. He doubled its circulation to 200,000 in New York City, making it the largest Italian-language daily in the country. The newspaper from 1889 to 1976 is now available on microfilm at the John D. Calandra Italian American Institute in NYC.

The newspaper published sympathetic coverage of Benito Mussolini and portrayed the Italian invasion of Ethiopia as a war between the civilised Italians and savage Ethiopians. Between 1941 and 1945, Il Progresso worked to spotlight the contributions of Italian-Americans serving in the U.S. armed forces and their role in securing victory during the war.

In May 2022, New York–based North Sixth Group invested in the revival of Il Progresso Italo-Americano and integrated it into America Domani, or America Tomorrow, a digital media community for Italian Americans. Publishing industry veteran Al DiGuido was named Publisher & CEO.

== See also ==
- Italians in New York City

== Sources ==
- Durante, Francesco, ed. (2014). Italoamericana: The Literature of the Great Migration, 1880-1943. New York: Fordham University Press. ISBN 978-0-8232-6062-1.
- Rossi, Adolfo (1892). Un italiano in America (in Italian) (1899 ed.). Milan: Fratelli Treves Edit.
- Rossi, Guido. "Il progresso Italo-Americano and its portrayal of Italian-American Servicemen (1941-1945)." Nuova Rivista Storica (2023) 107#2 pp. 759–787
