= Verdi Square =

Public park in Manhattan, New York

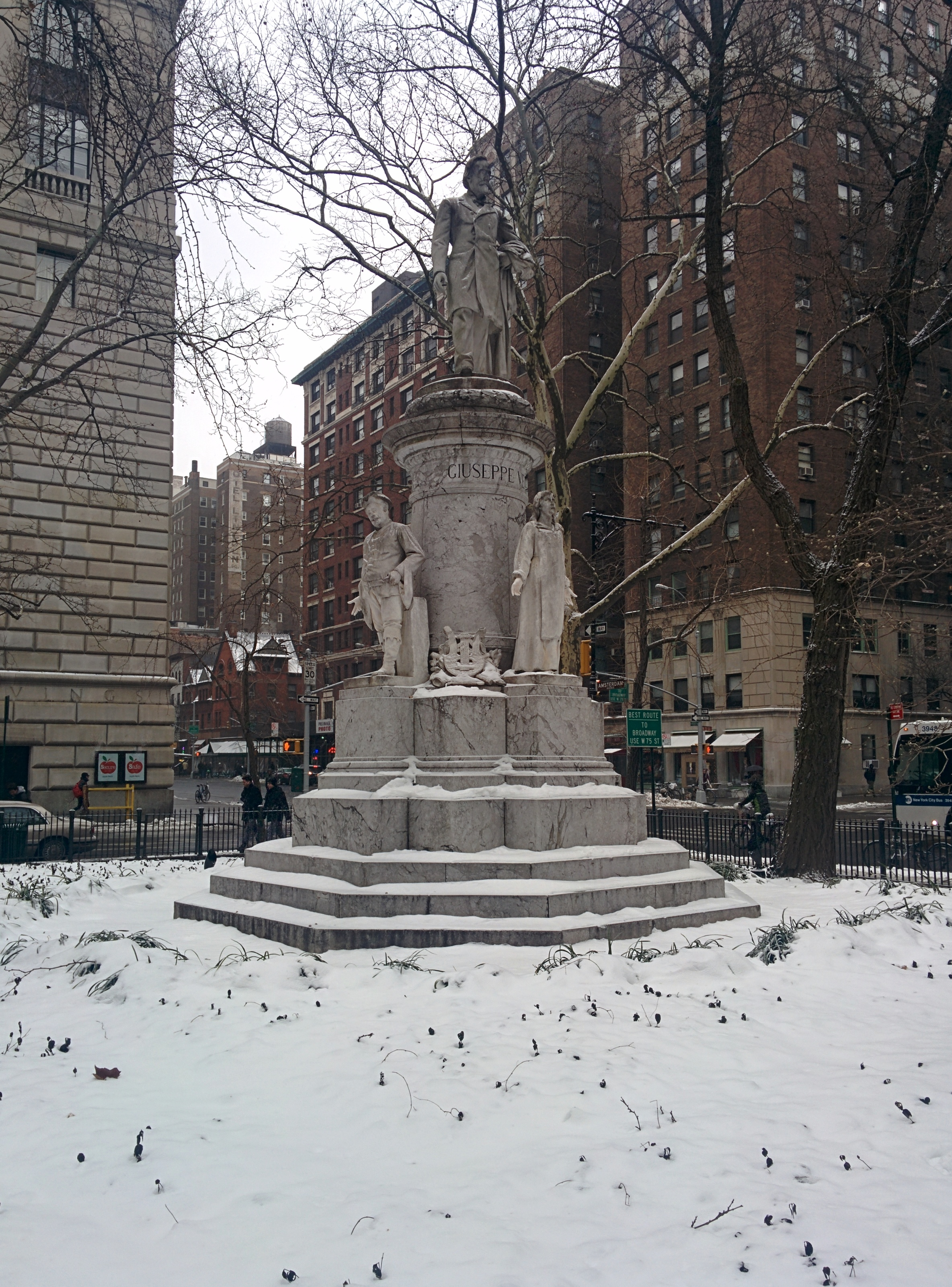
- Interactive map of Verdi Square
- Type: Traffic island, urban park
- Location: Manhattan, New York City, United States
- Coordinates: 40°46′45″N 73°58′54″W
- Area: 0.1 acres (400 m^{2})
- Created: 1887; 139 years ago
- Owner: NYC Parks
- Status: Open all year
- Public transit: Subway: 72nd Street (1, 2, and 3 trains)

U.S. National Register of Historic Places
- Designated: October 4, 1990
- Reference no.: 90002223
- Designated entity: Verdi Monument

New York City Landmark
- Designated: January 28, 1975
- Reference no.: 0857
- Designated entity: Verdi Square

Verdi Square is a 0.1-acre (400 m^{2}) park on a trapezoidal traffic island on the Upper West Side of Manhattan in New York City. Named for Italian opera composer Giuseppe Verdi, the park is bounded by 72nd Street on the south, 73rd Street on the north, Broadway on the west, and Amsterdam Avenue on the east. Verdi Square's irregular shape arises from Broadway's diagonal path relative to the Manhattan street grid. The western half of the park is built on the former northbound lanes of Broadway, which were closed permanently in 2003 during a renovation of the New York City Subway's adjacent 72nd Street station. Verdi Square is designated as a New York City scenic landmark and is maintained by the New York City Department of Parks and Recreation.

The eastern half of Verdi Square contains the Verdi Monument, sculpted in 1906 by Pasquale Civiletti. The monument contains a dark-granite pedestal with four statues of characters from Verdi's operas; a statue of Verdi stands atop the pedestal. Surrounding the monument is the original park, a triangular site with plantings. The western half of the park contains a head house that serves as an entrance to the 72nd Street station. Designed by Richard Dattner & Partners and Gruzen Samton, the head house contains artwork that references Verdi's opera Rigoletto. Each September, the park hosts a series of free concerts called Verdi Square Festival of the Arts.

The portion of Broadway around modern-day Verdi Square opened in 1703 and was added to the Commissioners' Plan of 1811, which created Manhattan's street grid, in the late 19th century. The city government acquired the site of Verdi Square in 1887. The site was originally the northern part of Sherman Square, under which the subway station was built in 1904. The Verdi Monument was installed in 1906 following a fundraising effort led by newspaper founder Carlo Barsotti, and the site around the monument was named for Verdi in 1921. The park was for several years beginning in the early 1970s (and is still, sometimes) referred to as "Needle Park", after the 1970 film The Panic in Needle Park, referring to the selling and use of heroin in that film (even though the site where that film was set, and much of it was shot, was Sherman Square, a similarly shaped but characterless grassy street divider a few blocks south on Broadway). The Verdi monument was restored in the late 1980s, and the park was significantly expanded in the early 2000s.

== Site ==
Verdi Square is operated by the New York City Department of Parks and Recreation and covers 0.10 acres (400 m^{2}). It occupies a trapezoidal site bounded by 72nd Street on the south, 73rd Street on the north, Broadway on the west, and Amsterdam Avenue on the east. Much of the park is built on the former northbound lane of Broadway. One block to the south is Sherman Square. On the north side, the park faces the Apple Bank Building at 2112 Broadway, designed by York and Sawyer. To the northwest is the Ansonia apartment complex, while to the southeast is another apartment building, the Dorilton. Two apartment buildings are on the east side of the square: the Severn and the Van Dyck, designed by Mulliken and Moller.

Originally, Verdi Square was a triangle. The park's shape arises from Broadway's diagonal alignment relative to the Manhattan street grid. Further south, the angled course of Broadway creates convergences with other avenues at Columbus Circle and at Times, Herald, Madison, and Union Squares. (Note: These intersections respectively correspond to Eighth Avenue/Central Park West (Columbus Circle), Seventh Avenue (Times Square), Sixth Avenue (Herald Square), Fifth Avenue (Madison Square), and Park/Fourth Avenues (Union Square).) Verdi Square is the northernmost location at which Broadway intersects an avenue diagonally, as Broadway straightens out to the north. The Museum of the City of New York described Verdi Square as one of several bowtie-shaped intersections "where the bustle of New York is brought out in all of its glory".

== Monument and plantings ==
The eastern section of Verdi Square contains the Giuseppe Verdi Monument, a monument to the opera composer Giuseppe Verdi, erected in 1906 and sculpted by Pasquale Civiletti. The monument measures 25.75 feet (7.85 m) tall and up to 18 feet (5.5 m) across. (Note: National Park Service 1990, p. 2, states only that it is more than 25.5 feet (7.8 m) tall.) The pedestal is made of dark granite steps, topped by a cylinder, and measures 15 feet (4.6 m) tall. Statues of four characters from Verdi's operas are on the pedestal: Aida, Otello, Leonora of La forza del destino, and Falstaff. These statues respectively face north, east, south, and west. The character statues are made of white Carrara marble, with large marble lyres placed between them. The western side of the pedestal contains an etching with Civiletti's name. A time capsule was embedded in the Verdi monument's base. The main statue of Verdi, placed atop the pedestal, is also made of white Carrara marble.

Surrounding the monument is a triangular green space surrounded by shrubs, walkways, and trees. Prior to Verdi Square's expansion, those were the only greenery in the park. In the landscaping devised by Lynden Miller in 2004, flowers around the statue bloom in the spring and summer months. In 2019, chairs and tables were installed around the monument. A garden known as the Woodland was planted around the Verdi Monument; it contains native species such as Lindera benzoin, Asclepias tuberosa, and Magnolia virginiana. A raised garden called the Meadow faces Broadway.

== Subway entrance and plaza ==
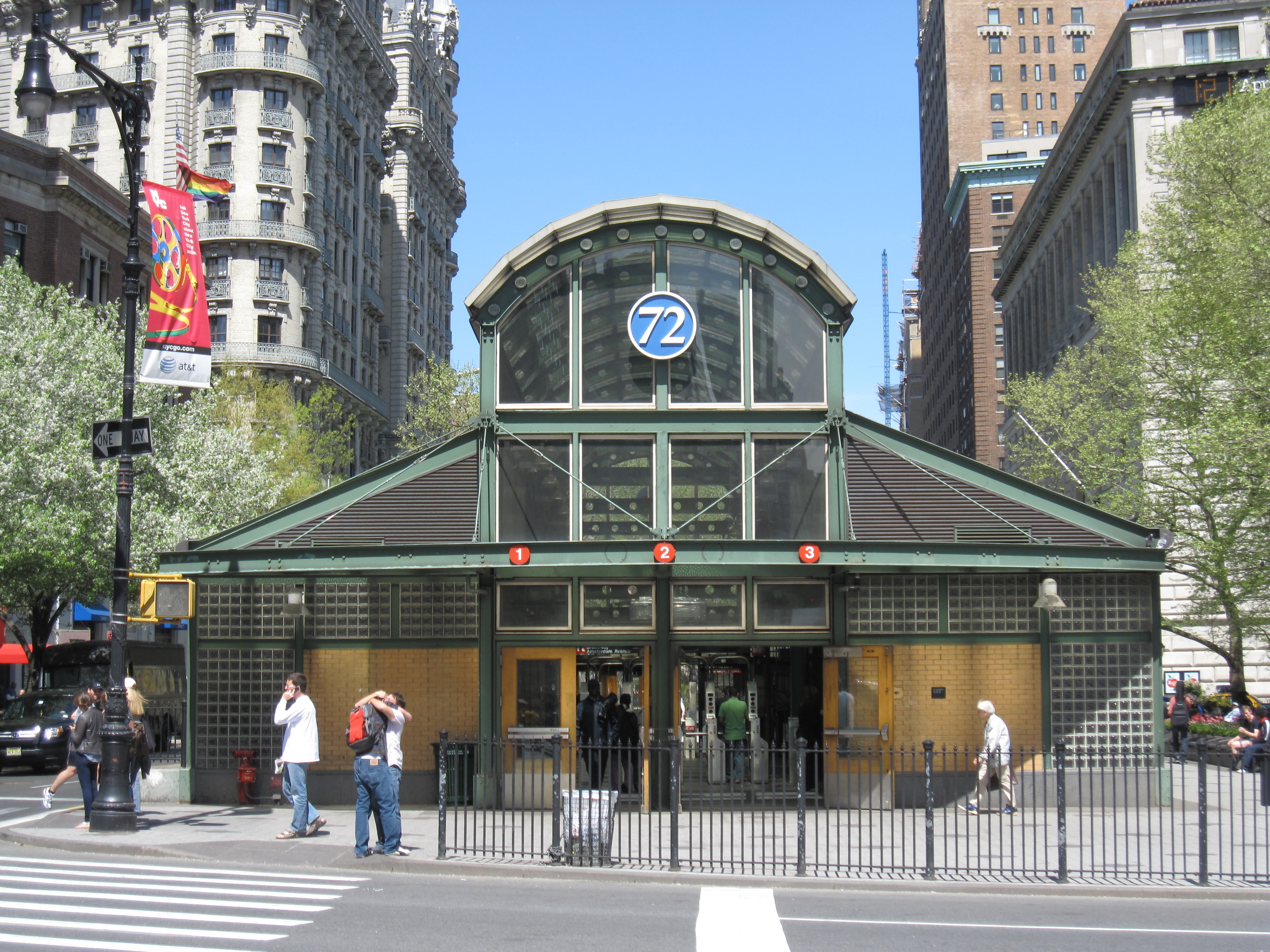
New head house

The 72nd Street station, served by the New York City Subway's 1, 2, and 3 trains, lies under the square. The western section of Verdi Square contains a head house, built on Broadway's former northbound lanes. The head house is one of two entrances for the 72nd Street station; the other, built within Sherman Square on the south side of 72nd Street in 1904, is one of the IRT Broadway–Seventh Avenue Line's three remaining original head houses. Verdi Square's head house was designed by Richard Dattner & Partners and Gruzen Samton. Its overall design was inspired by the Crystal Palace in London. The artwork inside is a mosaic pattern, signifying the notation for an excerpt from Verdi's Rigoletto. Elevators and stairs from the head house lead down to the station's platforms.

Next to the entrance is a plaza containing granite urns with raised plantings. The urns are made of cast iron and are near the northern end of the park. The urns were inspired by bronze planters, designed by Stanford White, near one entrance to Prospect Park in Brooklyn. The Verdi Square planters do not have cobra-shaped handles, unlike the Prospect Park planters. Additionally, the design of the planters was modified to fit Verdi Square's surroundings.

There is a concession stand next to the plaza, which was built in 2002 as a newsstand. NYC Parks considered removing the newsstand in 2015, on the grounds that there was also a newsstand in the subway entrance. The concession stand was leased by a Le Pain Quotidien bakery in 2016. Though the New York City Department of Health and Mental Hygiene cited the stand for unsanitary conditions the next year, the concession remains in operation as of 2022.

Near the 72nd Street end of the plaza is a bronze lamppost, one of two that originally flanked the Firemen's Memorial on Riverside Drive. Installed at Verdi Square in 2004, the pole dates to between 1913 and 1935 and was removed from its original location in the 1970s, when it was vandalized. The pole contains a bronze coating with cloven hooves at the base and rams' heads at its pinnacle. Verdi Square also contains Odalisca, a sculpture by Spanish artist Manolo Valdés. The sculpture alludes to the artwork of Pablo Picasso and Henri Matisse.

== History ==
The portion of Broadway around modern-day Verdi Square opened in 1703 as Bloomingdale Road, which extended from Lower Manhattan in the south to modern-day Morningside Heights in the north. The road originally only measured 33 feet (10 m) wide. In the 1760s, a neighborhood known as Harsenville was developed around Bloomingdale Road between modern-day 68th and 81st Streets, after farmer Jacob Harsen moved there with his family. The neighborhood contained several countryside villas, which overlooked the Hudson River to the south. Many French people settled in the area in the aftermath of the French Revolution in the 1790s, including Louis Philippe I, who later became the king of France.

Bloomingdale Road was initially excluded from the Manhattan street grid, which was laid out as part of the Commissioners' Plan of 1811. Because the Upper West Side was largely undeveloped until the late 19th century, Bloomingdale Road remained in use. Bloomingdale Road was widened to 75 feet (23 m) in 1849 and was renamed Broadway. In 1867, city planner Andrew Haswell Green convinced the state legislature to give his Central Park Commission the power to make changes in the grid north of 59th Street. Green laid out a street through the West Side along the path of Bloomingdale Road. Work began in 1867, and the road between 59th and 155th Streets was widened the next year, becoming an avenue with landscaped medians. The road was called "Western Boulevard" or "The Boulevard" and measured 150 feet (46 m) wide; it was paved in 1874. Residential developments in the area increased in the late 1870s, and the Harsenville neighborhood was consequently razed by the 1880s.

=== Creation and early years ===
What is now Verdi Square was acquired by the government of New York City in 1887. The site was then considered part of Sherman Square, which in turn was named after U. S. Army general William Tecumseh Sherman. In 1899, the Boulevard was renamed Broadway. By then, planning for the city's first subway line was underway; the line was planned to run under Broadway on the Upper West Side. A plan was formally adopted in 1897, and all legal conflicts concerning the route alignment were resolved near the end of 1899. August Belmont Jr., incorporated the Interborough Rapid Transit Company (IRT) in April 1902 to operate the subway. Work on the IRT's West Side Line (now the Broadway–Seventh Avenue Line) from 60th Street to 82nd Street had begun in August 1900. The tunnel was built directly under Broadway using a cut and cover method of construction, requiring the avenue's pavement to be ripped up. The 72nd Street station opened on October 27, 1904, though its initial entrance was south of 72nd Street.

Meanwhile, Carlo Barsotti, the founder of Italian-language daily newspaper Il Progresso Italo-Americano, had started raising funds for a monument to Italian composer Giuseppe Verdi after the latter died in 1901. Though the monument had received $4,000 worth of subscriptions by early 1903, a site had yet to be selected. Ultimately, the Verdi Monument's backers decided to install it in the northern section of Sherman Square. Pasquale Civiletti sculpted the monument in his studio in Italy, and it was shipped to the U.S. at the end of August 1906. The monument's cornerstone was laid on September 20, 1906, and the monument was dedicated on October 12, 1906, coinciding with Columbus Day. Thousands of people were present at the dedication, including representatives of the Spanish, French, German, Russian, and Argentine governments. Contemporary newspapers variously reported the cost of the monument as $20,000 or $30,000. At the time of the dedication, Barsotti still owed some money on the monument. As a result, a fundraiser for the monument was hosted during a luncheon in Barsotti's and Civiletti's honor in June 1907.

In the decade after the subway's opening, the surrounding area grew rapidly into a residential neighborhood. The northern section of Sherman Square was dedicated as Verdi Square in 1921. Musicians frequently visited the park during the early 20th century. These included tenor Enrico Caruso and conductor Arturo Toscanini, who lived in the Ansonia, as well as composers George and Ira Gershwin, who lived a few blocks away on Riverside Drive. In addition, the Central Savings Bank Building (later Apple Bank Building) was erected north of Verdi Square from 1926 to 1928, with a narrow facade on the square. By the late 1920s, dirt had accumulated on the Verdi statue. The managers of the Hotel Ansonia wrote a letter to the city's parks commissioner in December 1929, offering to clean the statue; the commissioner readily accepted this offer. The next month, the statue was cleaned by several Metropolitan Opera members who lived at the Ansonia. Several dozen pigeons at the park were poisoned in 1937 in the city's first recorded mass poisoning of birds; the perpetrator was never caught.

=== Decline and preservation ===
Through the mid-20th century, Verdi Square existed as a small traffic island between Amsterdam Avenue and Broadway. Its widest frontage on 73rd Street was only slightly wider than the median of Broadway. An image from 1955 indicated that the Verdi monument was surrounded by fences and benches. In the 1960s and 1970s, Verdi Square and Sherman Square were highly frequented by local drug users and dealers. As part of a citywide "beautification" initiative announced in 1967, the city government would have planted trees and flowers in the park. The nickname "Needle Park" came to be applied to Verdi Square after the release of the 1971 film The Panic in Needle Park, although the "Needle Park" in the film might have been Sherman Square. In 1972, local teenagers repainted the benches and planted 300 begonias in the park.

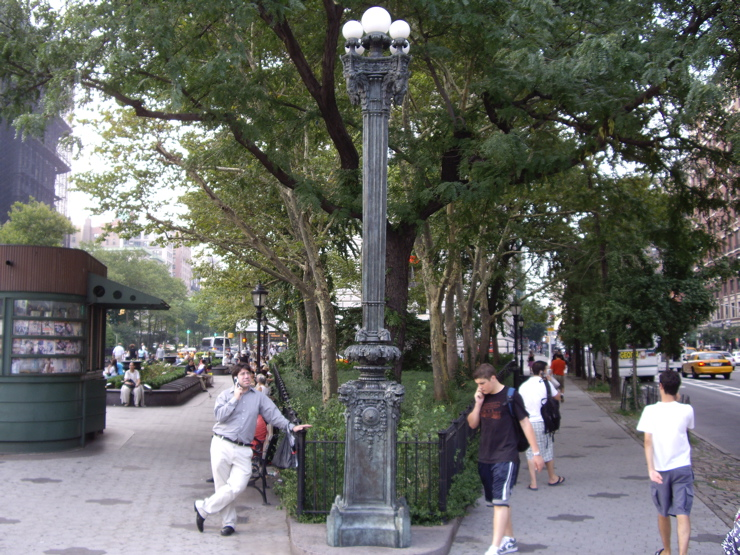
The bronze luminaire once stood by the Firemen's Memorial at Riverside Drive at 100th Street; it was re-erected here at the refurbishing of Verdi Square in 2004

The New York City Landmarks Preservation Commission (LPC) proposed designating Verdi Square as a scenic landmark in November 1974. The LPC had gained the authority to designate city parks as scenic landmarks the preceding year. The square was designated as a landmark on January 28, 1975, along with the facade of the adjacent Apple Bank Building; the New York City Board of Estimate ratified the designations that March. Residents of the Ansonia cleaned the monument in mid-1975, and it was cleaned again in 1977. Civic organization Friends of Verdi Square held free concerts at the park in October 1976 to raise money for a planned $70,000 renovation. The organization planned to relocate benches, fence off the statue, and add bright lights.

In 1983, The New York Times wrote that "a succession" of homeless men slept on the park's 73rd Street sidewalk because warm air came from the subway ventilation grate there. By the end of that decade, the Times described Verdi Square as having undergone a "noticeable transformation". The park was still used by homeless people at night, even though it served as a busy meeting place for elderly residents during the day. In 1987, NYC Parks announced that the Verdi monument would be restored for $300,000. Over the years, the marble had cracked because of repeated freezing and thawing of water during the winter, as the Carrara marble was naturally soft. The entire monument had to be removed for restoration, and NYC Parks planned to clean the monument regularly after it was restored.

NYC Parks' antiquities director Jonathan Kuhn sought funding for a further restoration of the monument. Kuhn asked pasta companies, attendees at a Verdi concert in Central Park, and the publicist of screenwriter Francis Ford Coppola to donate money, but he was unsuccessful. Ultimately, Italian brand Bertolli funded the monument's restoration, which was completed in June 1996. Bertolli also donated $50,000 to a maintenance fund for the monument. The same decade, parks commissioner Henry J. Stern also installed a flagpole in Verdi Square, one of 750 he installed without receiving prior approval from the New York City Art Commission or the LPC. The New York City government opened a seasonal greenmarket at Verdi Square in 1997. The market attracted two dozen farmers and 2,500 to 5,000 visitors each weekend and was shown in the 1998 film You've Got Mail.

=== Expansion ===
Dattner Architects and Gruzen Samton had completed a design for the 72nd Street station's renovation in 1996. The architects announced plans for the renovation two years later, which included a new entrance in Verdi Square. The plans included closing the three northbound lanes of Broadway from 72nd to 73rd Street, which were mainly used by buses, and diverting northbound traffic to Amsterdam Avenue. This move, which would more than double Verdi Square's size, would offset the loss of park space caused by the head house's construction. The New York State Legislature had to agree to transfer ownership of the roadway to NYC Parks. The new subway entrance would contain elevators directly above the platforms; as a result, Broadway's southbound lanes also had to be shifted to the west. Local residents and business owners expressed concerns that Broadway's western sidewalk would be narrowed by up to 8 feet (2.4 m). The greenmarket was closed in December 1999 to make way for the renovation.

Work on the project, which was to cost $53 million (equivalent to $99.1 million in 2025), commenced in June 2000. When excavations began, contractors discovered that the Verdi monument was infested with rats; residents had known about the infestations for years and had nicknamed the park "Vermin Square". The northbound lanes of Broadway were permanently closed in 2001, and the head house was built in the expanded park. The station's renovation was completed on October 29, 2002. The project was closed-out fourteen months late due to a setback in the installation of street lighting, as well as the New York City Department of Transportation's acceptance of the project. The Firemen's Memorial lamppost was renovated and installed in the park in 2004 upon the request of former parks commissioner Stern. Stern had wanted to surround the monument with a fence depicting parading elephants, a reference to Verdi's Aida, but the Art Commission disapproved because it would "detract from the monument". NYC Parks also hung a fake owl in a tree near the Verdi Monument to deter roosting pigeons, and the Odalisca sculpture was installed in Verdi Square in 2010.

After the park's renovation was completed, local resident Lauri Grossman contacted several friends to organize an opera festival there, having been inspired by street musicians she saw during a trip to Europe. Many people, including then-parks commissioner Adrian Benepe, supported the proposal. George Litton, father of orchestral conductor Andrew Litton, launched the annual Verdi Square Festival of the Arts in September 2006. The festival's first season contained two concerts performed by the Manhattan School of Music and The New School; subsequent seasons were expanded to three concerts due to their popularity. The festival consists of three free outdoor Sunday afternoon concerts, presenting young musicians in repertoire ranging from opera to bluegrass. Each concert typically included printed programs for 400 guests. The concerts typically took place during September, but two of the 2009 concerts were moved to May due to holidays in September.

Verdi Square gradually fell into disrepair again after its renovation. Though the Times reported in 2014 that Verdi Square "has become as much a place to hang out as pass through", local residents cited an increase in homeless people in the park. The Verdi Monument was restored in mid-2016 as part of NYC Parks' Citywide Monuments Conservation Program. Additionally, a Le Pain Quotidien bakery opened in the park's concession stand in 2016. Local resident Aleya Lehmann founded an organization, Friends of Verdi Square, in 2018 to clean up the park. The next year, Friends of Verdi Square installed seating areas around the monument and cleaned up the park with guidance from NYC Parks officials. Verdi Square became an official partner of NYC Parks in September 2019. With this cleanup, the park's rodent population had decreased by 95 percent by March 2020. Plans for renovations to Verdi Square, which included mechanical upgrades and a new asphalt path, were proposed to the LPC in February 2025.

== See also ==
- Memorials to Giuseppe Verdi
- List of New York City Designated Landmarks in Manhattan from 59th to 110th Streets
- List of New York City scenic landmarks
- List of parks in New York City
- National Register of Historic Places listings in Manhattan from 59th to 110th Streets
