= Teatro Verdi (Sassari) =

Coordinates: 40.7271°N 8.5634°E

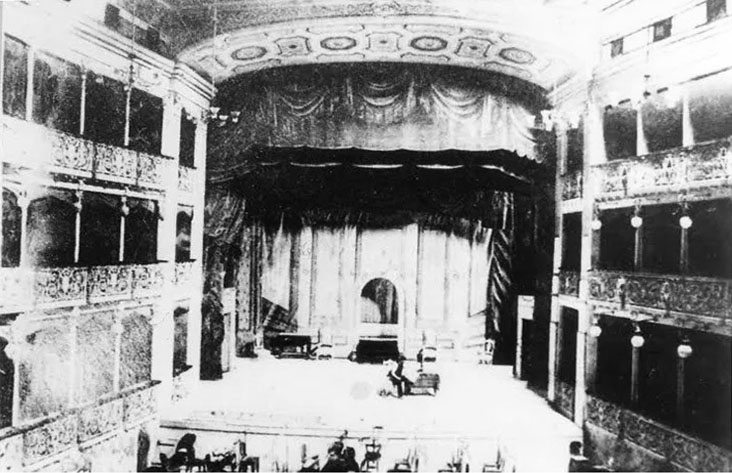
Teatro Verdi in Sassari, 1895

The Teatro Verdi is a theatre and opera house in Sassari, Italy, named after composer Giuseppe Verdi. Constructed in 1883–1884, the theatre was inaugurated with composer Luigi Canepa's opera Riccardo III on 8 December 1884. The original theatre was destroyed by a fire in 1923. It was rebuilt three years later in its present form and went under a massive restoration in 1984. The theatre remains an important cultural centre for the arts in Sassari, hosting performances of concerts, plays, musicals, and operas.
