= Teatro Verdi (Brindisi) =

Coordinates: 40°38′20″N 17°56′40″E

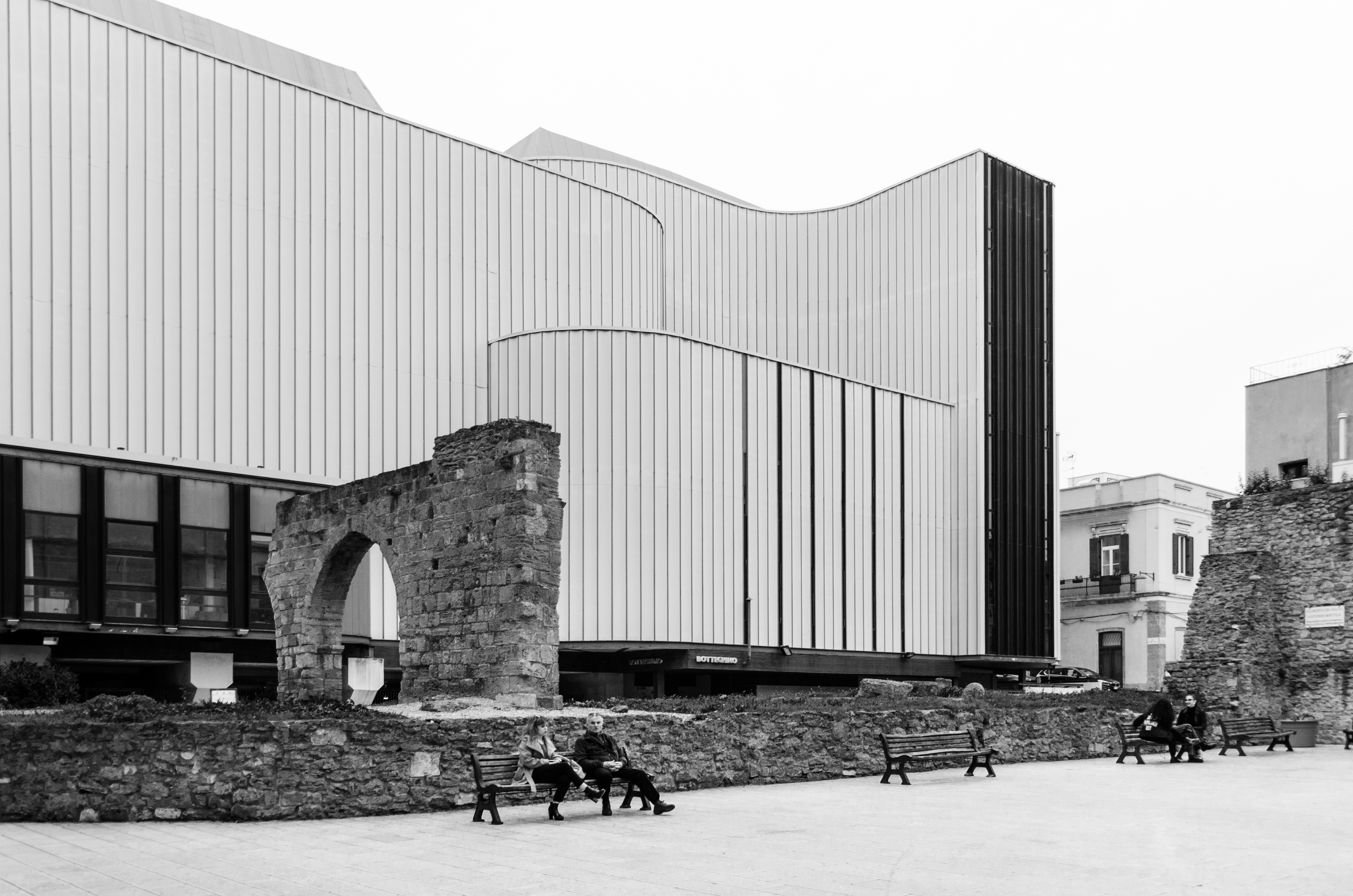

The Nuovo Teatro Giuseppe Verdi is a theatre in Brindisi, Italy, which opened on December 20, 2006. Stefano Miceli became chairman of the theatre foundation in 2022.

== Structure ==
The theatre, 1172 seats, is located in the city center of Brindisi, and has a surface area of 4500 square meters, and a volume of 40 thousand cubic meters. Along the bottom of the main hall (738 seats) are two tunnels (respectively 351 and 83 admissions). The total capacity is 1172 seats. The stage is one of the largest in Italy, being 25.50 m wide, 18 m high and 20 m deep.

== Nuovo Teatro Verdi Orchestra ==
The Orchestra of the Nuovo Teatro Verdi was founded in 2022 and was the resident orchestra of the theater.
