= Pietro Balbo =

Italian-American murderer (died 1880)

- Born: Sala Consilina, Provincia di Salerno, Campania, Italy
- Known for: Italian immigrant to the United States who murdered his wife
- Spouse: Maria Diebaco Balbo (d.1879)
- Parents: Natale Balbo (father); Rosa Spinelli (mother)

Pietro Balbo was an Italian immigrant to the United States who murdered his wife. He who was born in Sala Consilina, Provincia di Salerno, Campania, Italy. Upon arrival in the United States, he lived in New York. He was the son of Natale Balbo and Rosa Spinelli. His mother remarried Salvatore Focarile.

== Murder ==
Balbo murdered his wife by cutting her throat at his residence. After the murder, Balbo removed earrings and a necklace from his wife's corpse. He was arrested in Wheeling, West Virginia, after fleeing. On December 11, 1879, Balbo was convicted of the murder of his wife Maria Diebaco Balbo. The death sentence was prescribed by Judge Daniels. At his sentencing, Balbo claimed self-defense.

== Sentence ==
Originally sentenced for execution on January 19, 1880, Balbo resided at The Tombs until his actual execution on August 6, 1880. During his time imprisoned Balbo studied English and kept a neat cell.

Balbo's appeal was argued in the court of appeals in Albany on February 26, 1880.

On May 21, 1880, Balbo was given respite by New York State Governor Alonzo B. Cornell.

The Italian minister in Washington hired a lawyer in an attempt to commute the death sentence and a petition of 45,000 signatures was gathered. At the request of the Italian Minister Alberto Blanc, Governor Cornell personally reviewed the conviction but due to the corpse robbery and attempt to flee, declined to interfere.

On August 2, 1880, Balbo wrote a farewell letter to his mother in which he mentions a sister Carmela and a brother Giovanni.

== Execution ==
Balbo was accompanied by Father Anacletus the night before his execution; Warden Finn was also present. Balbo slept little and was restless the entire time, weeping and praying, reciting the stations of the cross. At 530 am his lawyer, Mr. Kintzing arrived. Shortly after 6 am Balbo accompanied by Father Anacletus, the deputy warden and two deputy sheriffs attended a catholic mass at the prison chapel where he also was given the rites of the church.

Balbo was served a final bowl of coffee at 750 am, once the coffee was consumed Balbo asked his lawyer for the sheriff, saying he was ready. The drop was not performed correctly and Balbo convulsed on the rope. After three minutes of hanging, Balbo still had a pulse of 100, indicating death thru strangulation and not a broken neck. After 16 minutes Balbo was lowered and his body was inspected by the city coroner who returned a verdict of death. Upon instruction of his lawyer, Balbos body was transferred to the undertakers Whalen And Farretti at the intersection of Worth and Baxter Streets.

The execution was a significant event to the Italian immigrant population of New York City at the time as he was the first Italian executed in New York City.
