= William Tecumseh Sherman (Saint-Gaudens) =

Sculpture group in Manhattan, New York, U.S.

William Tecumseh Sherman Victory
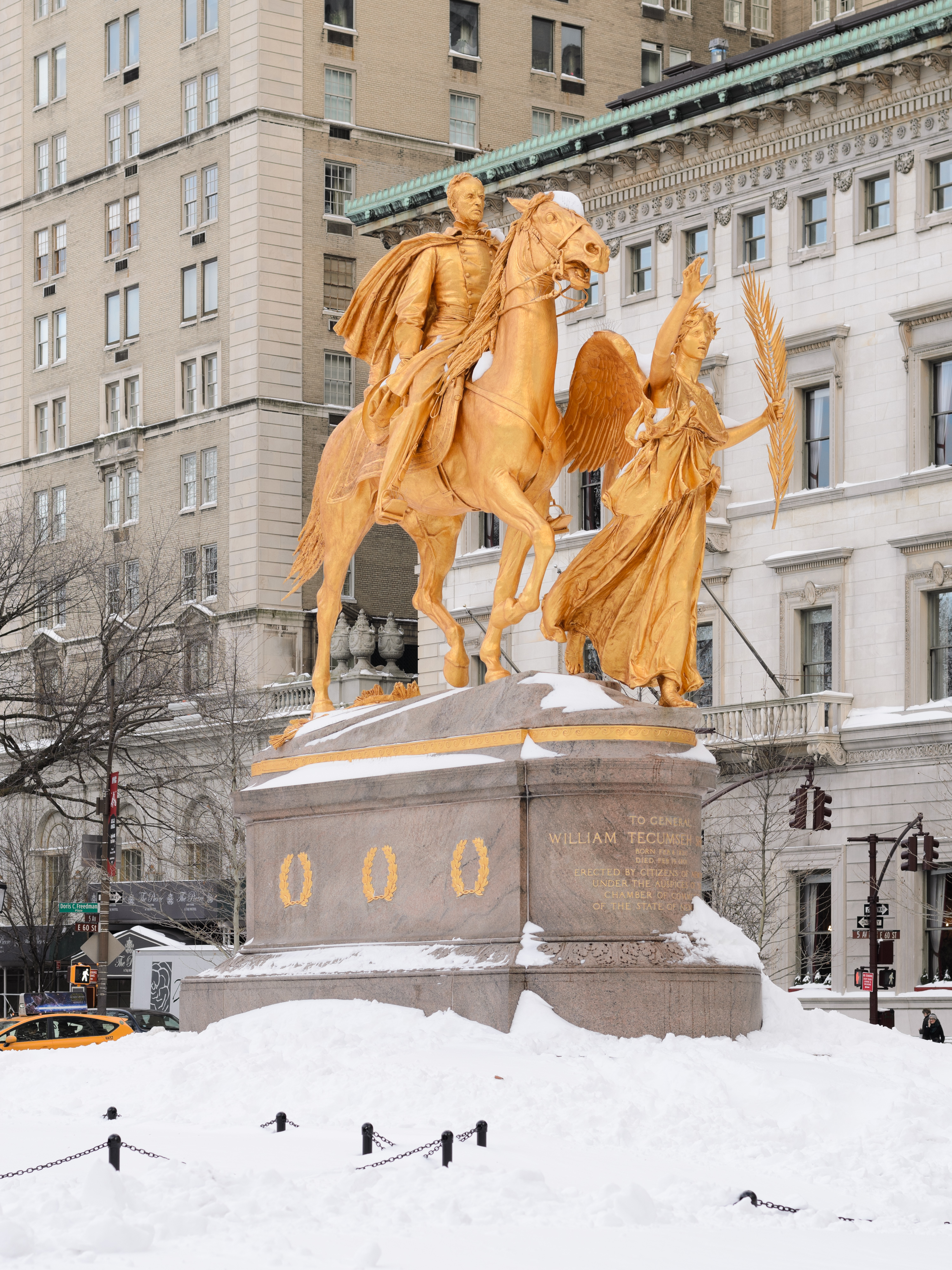
- The sculptures in 2016
- Artist: Augustus Saint-Gaudens
- Year: 1903
- Type: Equestrian sculpture
- Medium: Bronze
- Subject: William Tecumseh Sherman
- Location: New York City, New York, U.S.; 40.7645°N 73.9732°W

William Tecumseh Sherman, also known as the Sherman Memorial or Sherman Monument, is a sculpture group honoring William Tecumseh Sherman, created by Augustus Saint-Gaudens and located at Grand Army Plaza in Manhattan, New York. Cast in 1902 and dedicated on May 30, 1903, the gilded-bronze monument consists of an equestrian statue of Sherman and an accompanying statue, Victory, an allegorical female figure of the Greek goddess Nike. The statues are set on a Stony Creek granite pedestal designed by the architect Charles Follen McKim.

== History ==
The idea for the statue dates back to as early as 1888. The architect Charles Follen McKim and sculptor Augustus Saint-Gaudens decided in 1902 to install an equestrian statue of U.S. Army general William Tecumseh Sherman in Central Park. Several sites had been considered, including Sherman Square on the Upper West Side; the median of Riverside Drive just south of Grant's Tomb; another site on Riverside Drive; and Grand Army Plaza. The Central Park Mall was also considered but ruled out. The statue was dedicated in the northern half of what would later become the Grand Army Plaza on May 30, 1903.

The plaza was re-landscaped in the 1910s after newspaper publisher Joseph Pulitzer died in 1911, bequeathing $50,000 for the creation of a memorial fountain. As part of the fountain's construction, the Sherman Monument remained in the northern half, but moved 15 feet (4.6 m) west to be symmetrically opposite the fountain.

On July 23, 1974, the Landmarks Preservation Commission designated Grand Army Plaza, including the Sherman Monument, as a New York City scenic landmark. On March 26, 1985, the Central Park Conservancy and the architecture firm of Buttrick White & Burtis presented plans to the Landmarks Preservation Commission for a full restoration of the plaza, including the Sherman Monument. The work was completed in June 1990, including a re-gilding of the statue, and the replacement of a palm frond and a sword that had been removed previously. Grand Army Plaza was renewed again in 2013, including a re-gilding of the statue of William Tecumseh Sherman.

Inscription: To general William Tecumseh Sherman, Born Feb 8 1820, Died Feb 14 1891, Erected by citizens of New York under the auspices of the Chamber of Commerce of the State of New York

== Critiques ==
According to the report prepared by the Landmarks Commission for its 1974 designation, many consider the Sherman Monument to be Saint-Gaudens’ finest work. Not everyone agreed; according to Frank Weitenkampf, sculptor John Quincy Adams Ward was less than enthusiastic about the equestrian composition: "Saint-Gaudens was a timid rider and it showed in this work.... if the horse should stumble the general would inevitably be thrown over his head."

== Use on coinage ==
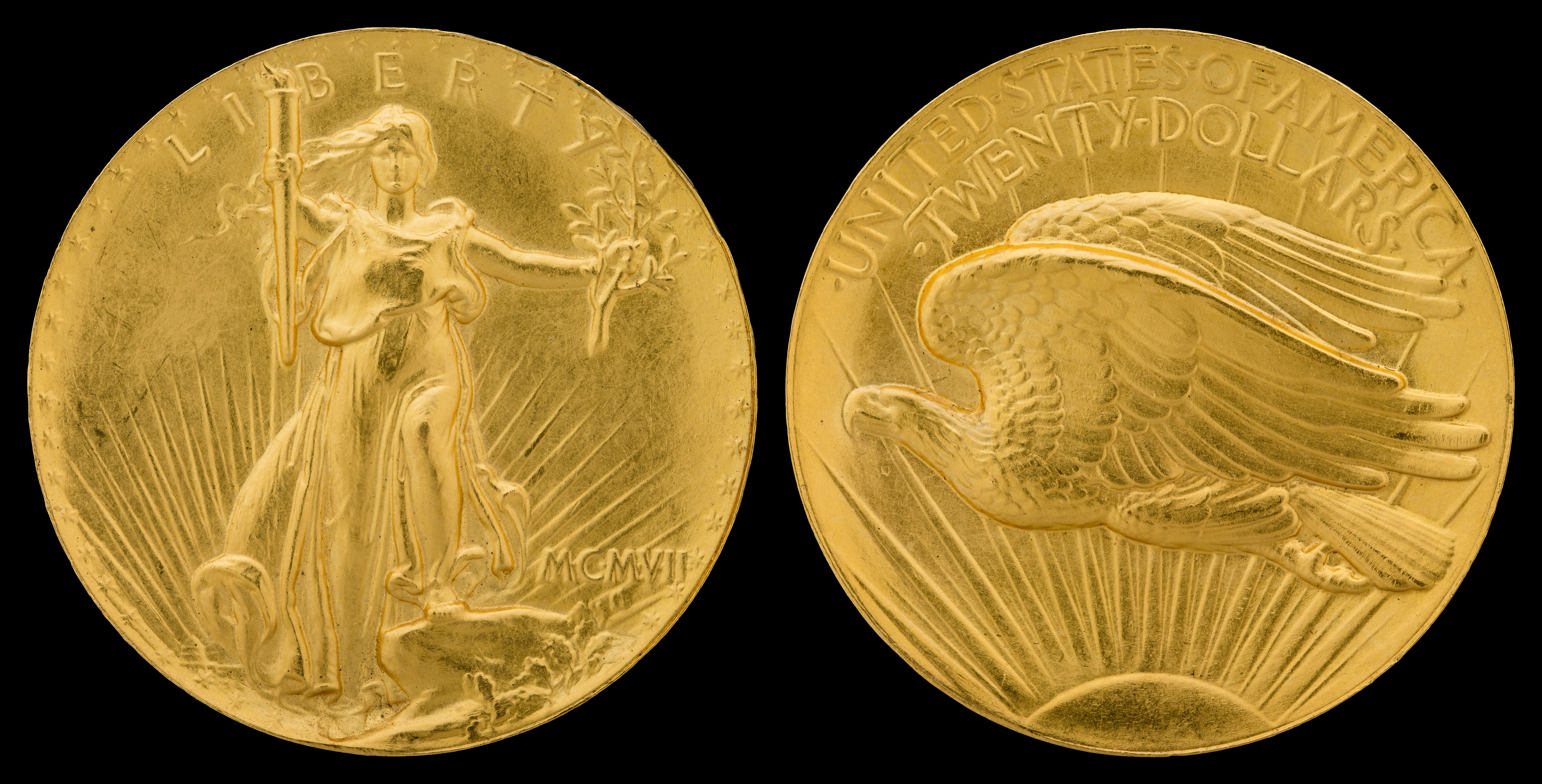
The 1907 Saint-Gaudens double eagle portraying Liberty is based on his statue of Victory.

The obverse of Saint-Gaudens' 1907 United States Saint-Gaudens double eagle coin, portraying Liberty, is based on his sculpture of Victory.

== Gallery ==
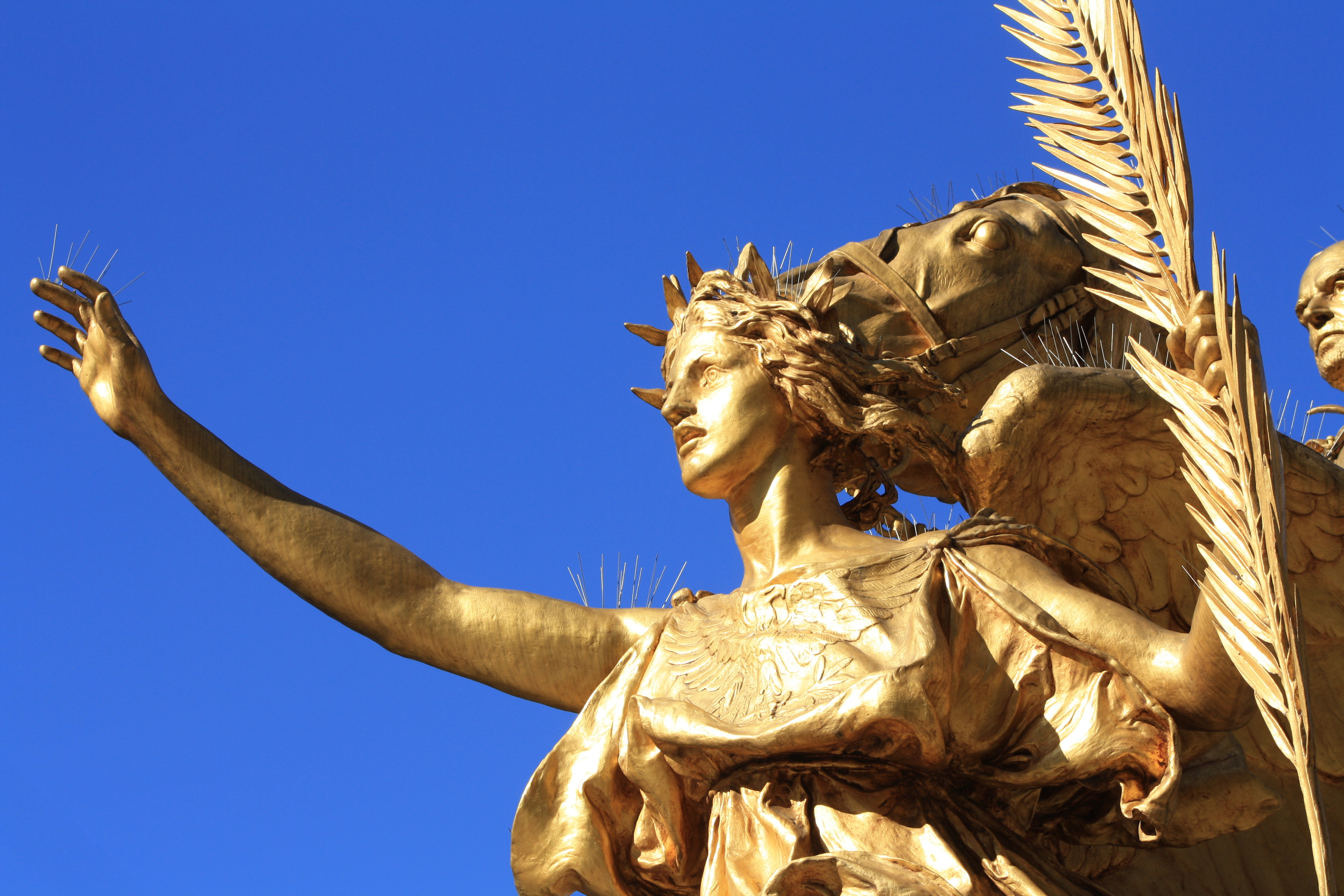
Head detail of the Victory figure

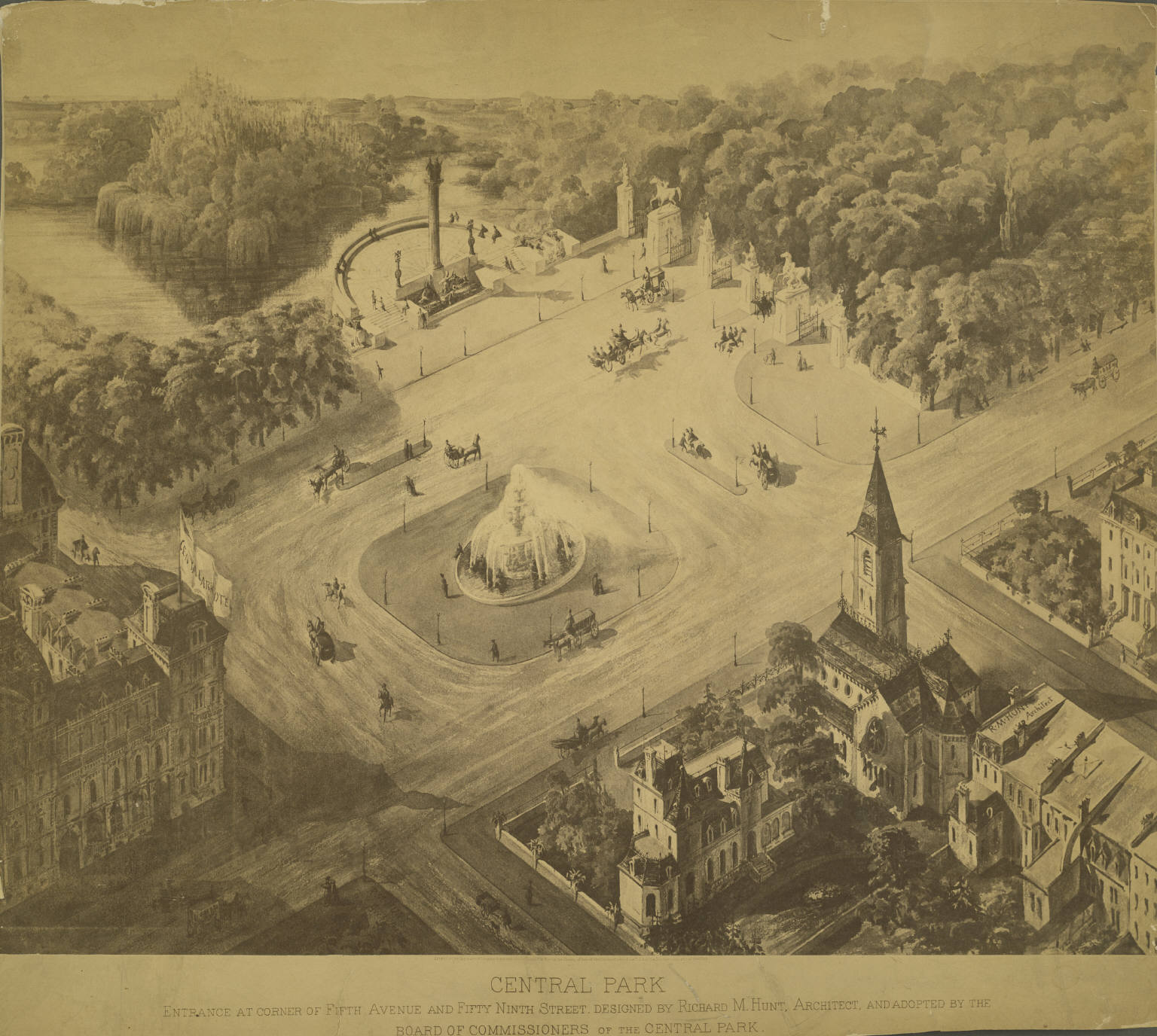
1863 design showing a proposed fountain (before the plaza was extended south to 58th Street)

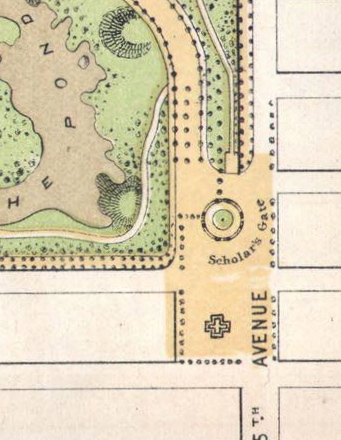
1868 map of Central Park includes the future site of the Sherman Monument.

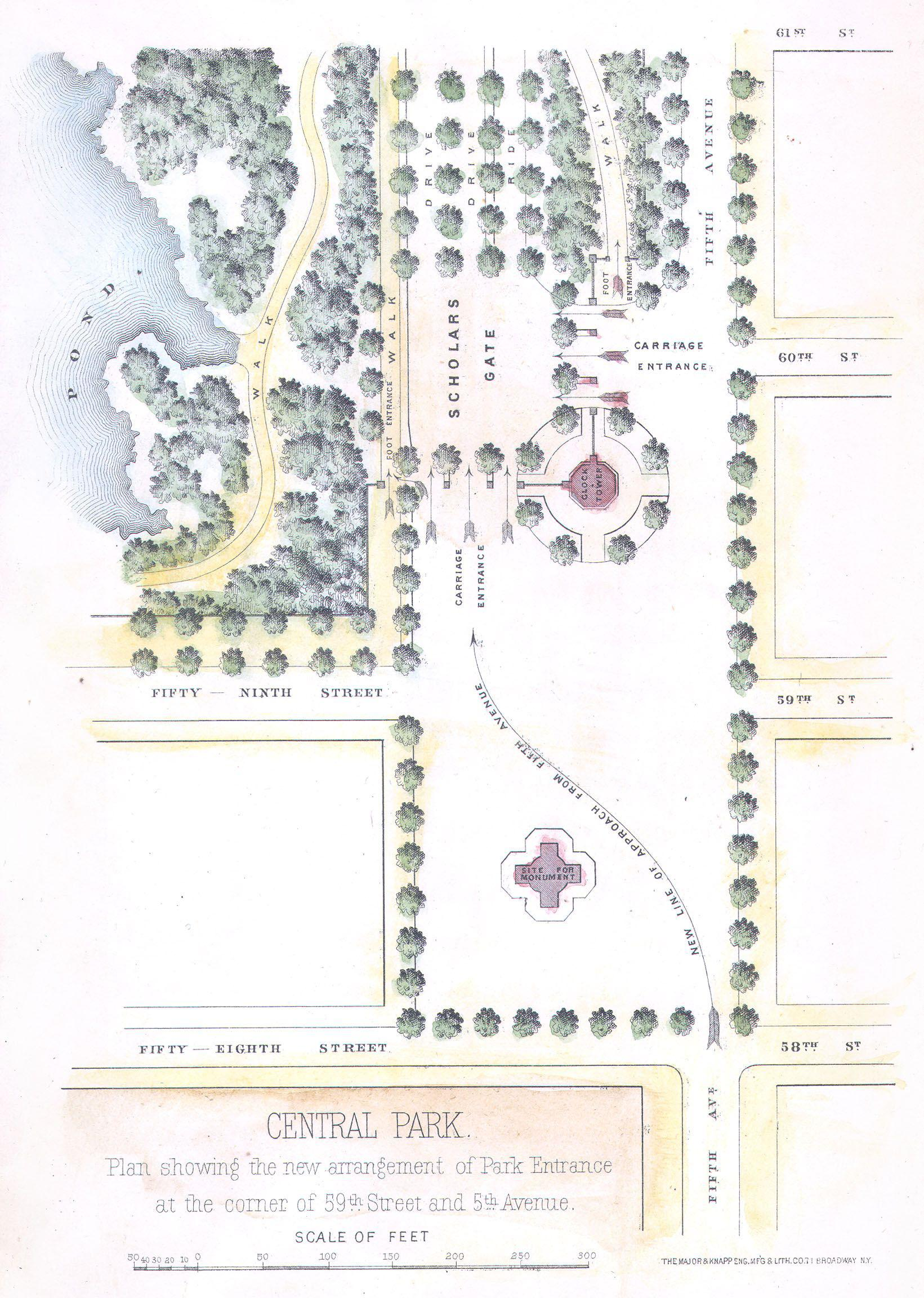
1869 map of the plaza, showing a site for a clock tower near where the Sherman statue was located in 1903

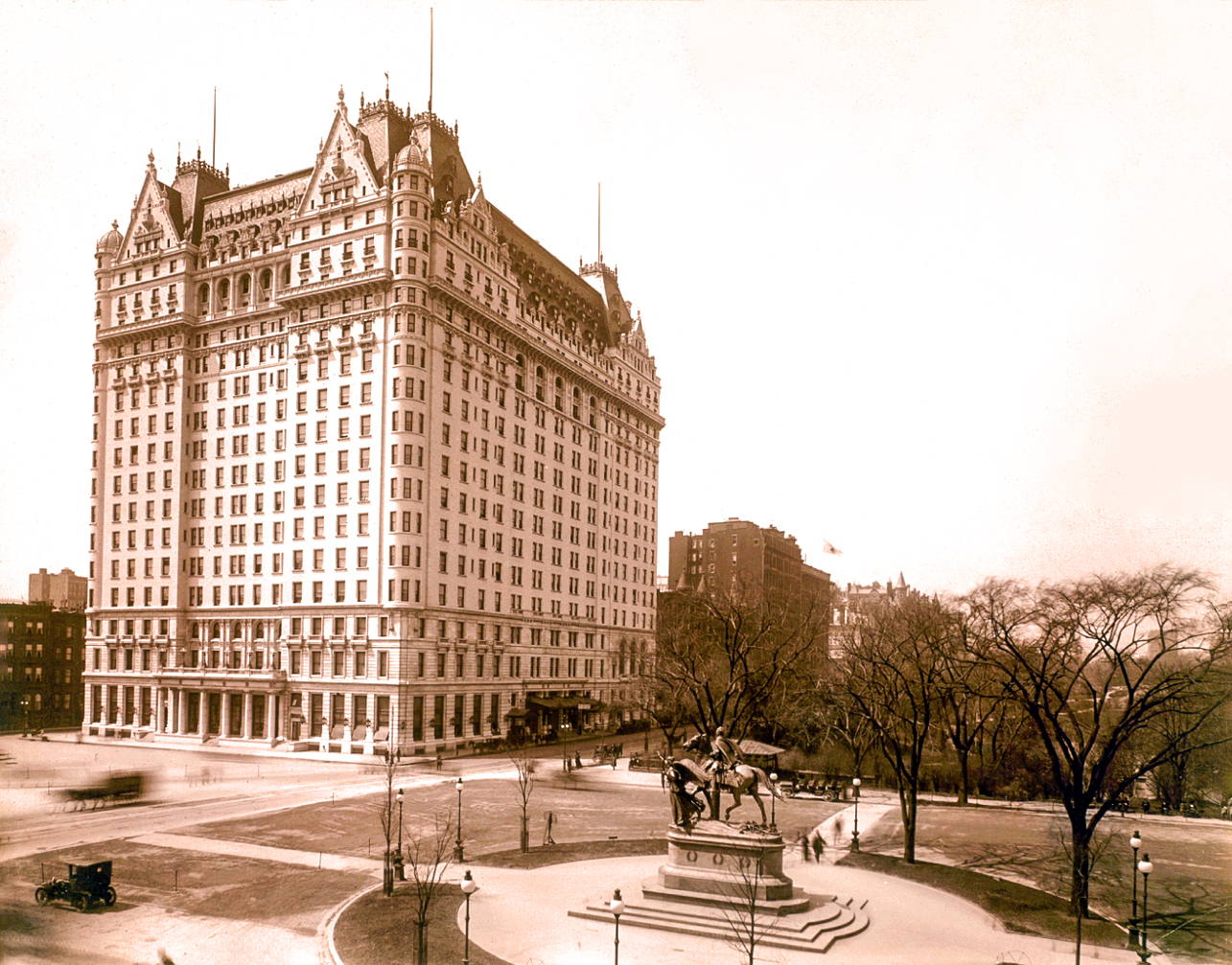
A view of the Sherman Monument circa 1908–1915, before the creation of the Grand Army Plaza

Thomas Hasting's 1913 plan for the plaza, showing the relocated Sherman statue in the northern (upper) half

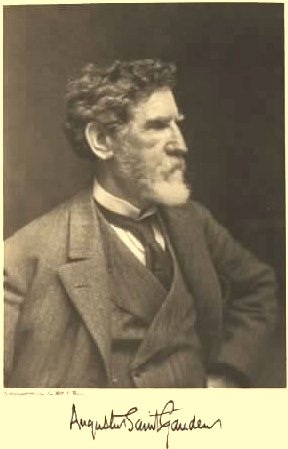
Augustus Saint-Gaudens, who sculpted the monument, photographed in 1905

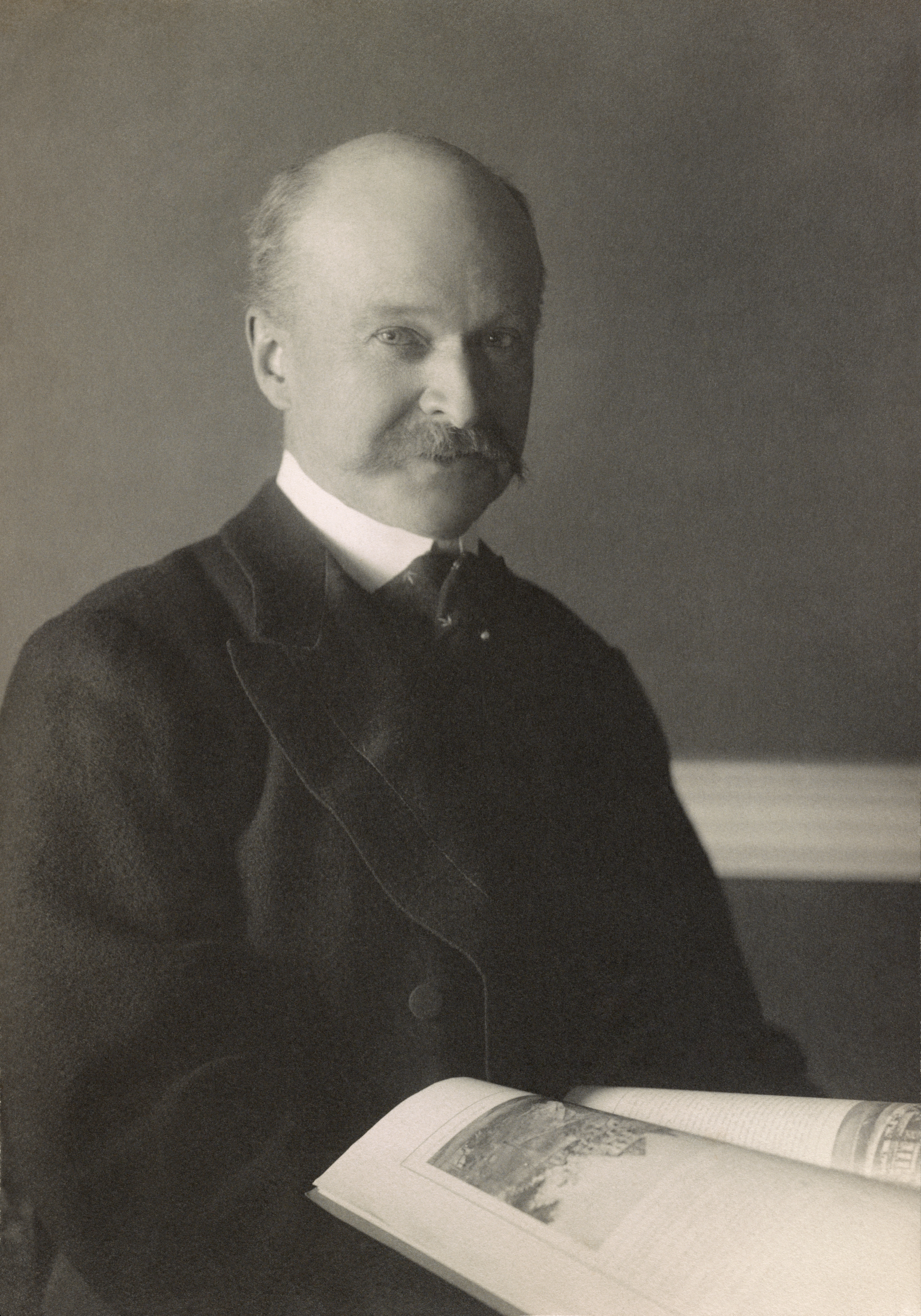
Architect Charles Follen McKim designed the pedestal of the monument.

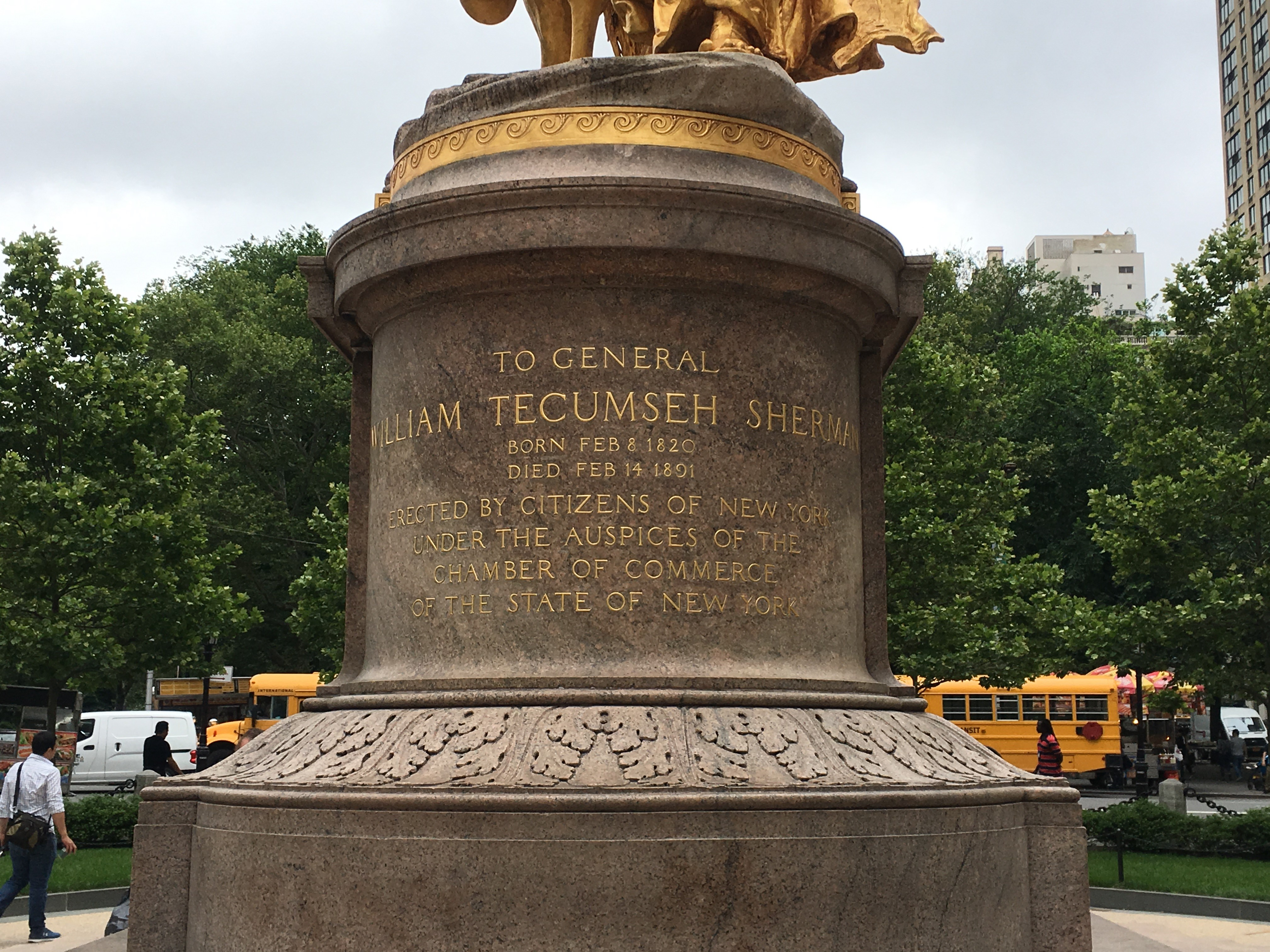
Detail of the Monument's pedestal

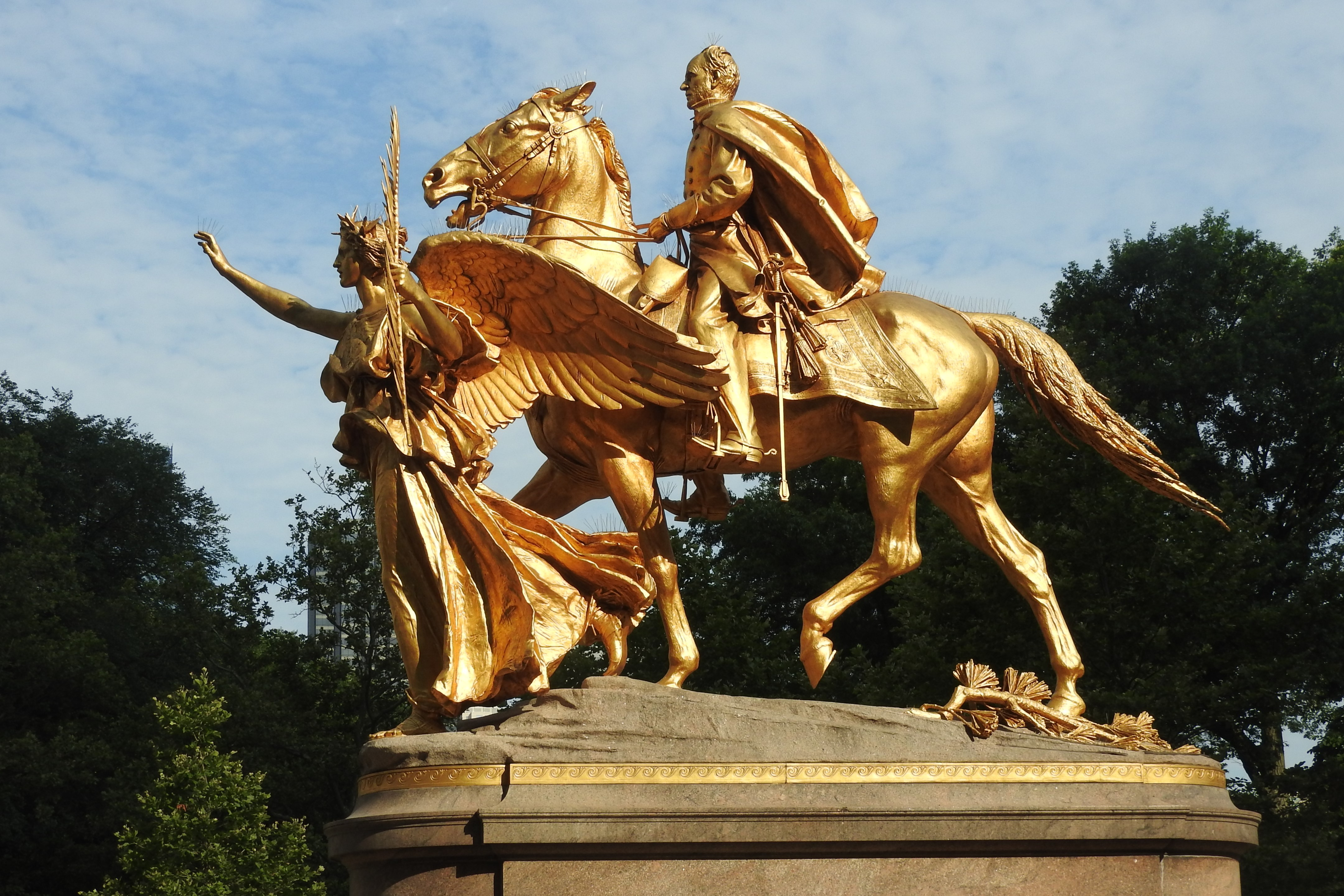
Southeast side

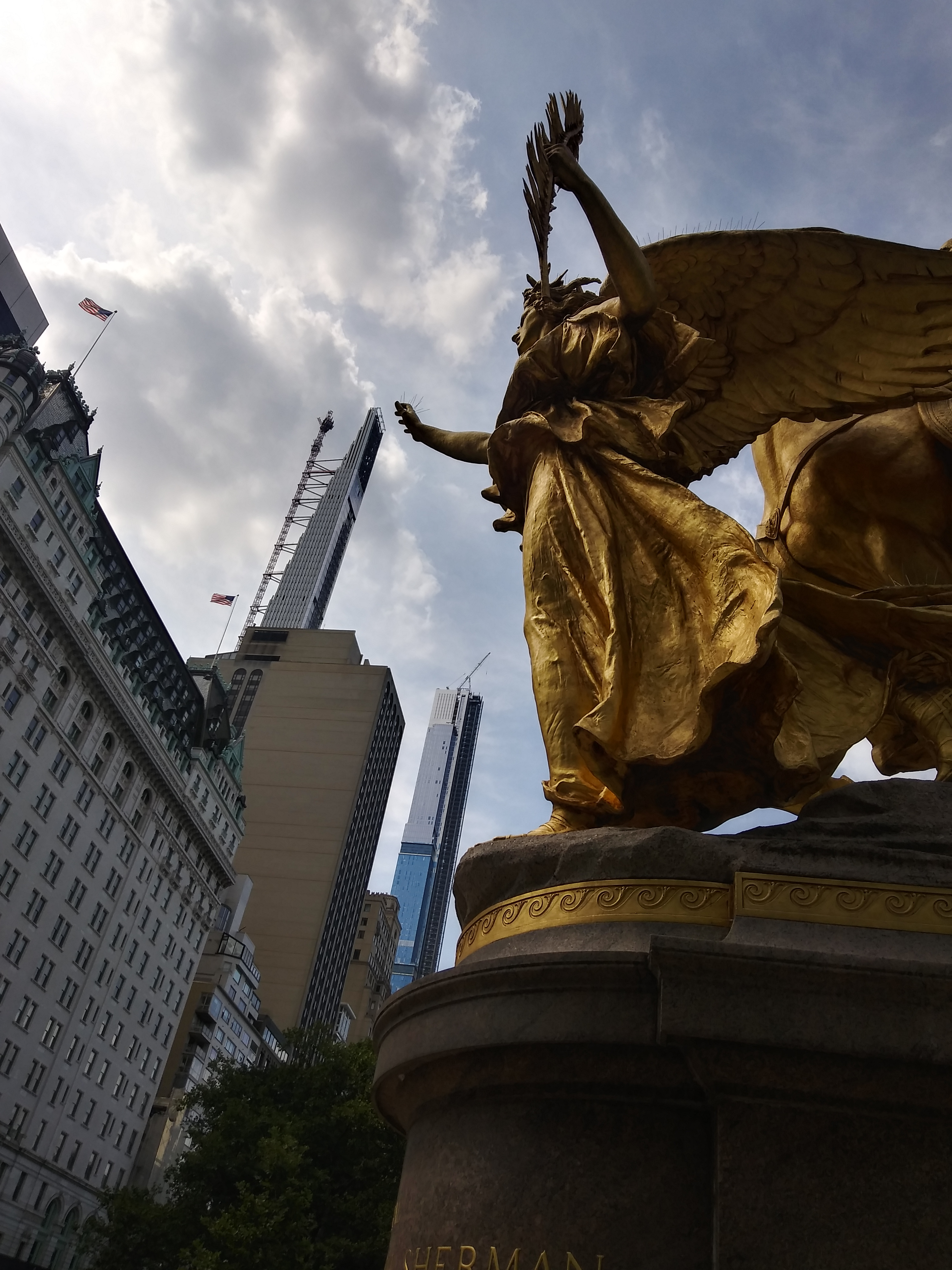
View looking southwest to Central Park South
