= Pulitzer Fountain =

Fountain and sculpture in Manhattan, New York, U.S.

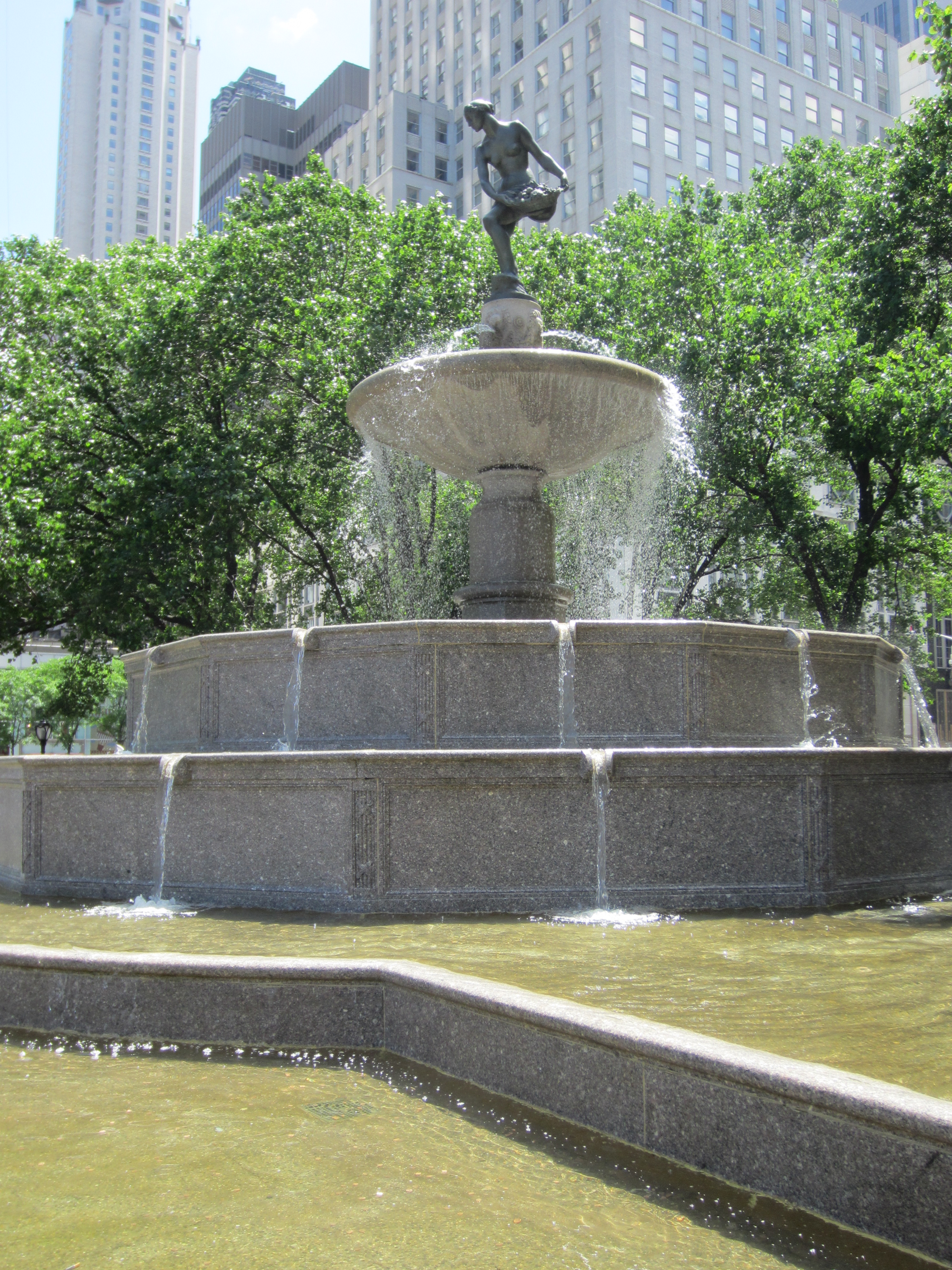
- The fountain and statue in 2014
- Artists: Karl Bitter (sculptor); Thomas Hastings (architect)
- Year: 1916
- Type: Fountain; sculpture
- Medium: Bronze; marble
- Subject: Pomona
- Dimensions: 6.7 m (22 ft)
- Location: New York City, New York, United States; 40.76403°N 73.97361°W

Pulitzer Fountain is an outdoor fountain located at Grand Army Plaza in Manhattan, New York. The fountain is named after newspaper publisher Joseph Pulitzer who died in 1911 having bequeathed $50,000 for the creation of the fountain. Pulitzer intended his fountain to be "like those in the Place de la Concorde, Paris, France." The fountain was designed by the architect Thomas Hastings, and crowned by a statue conceived by the sculptor Karl Bitter. The fountain was dedicated in May 1916.

== History ==
=== Initial design and construction ===
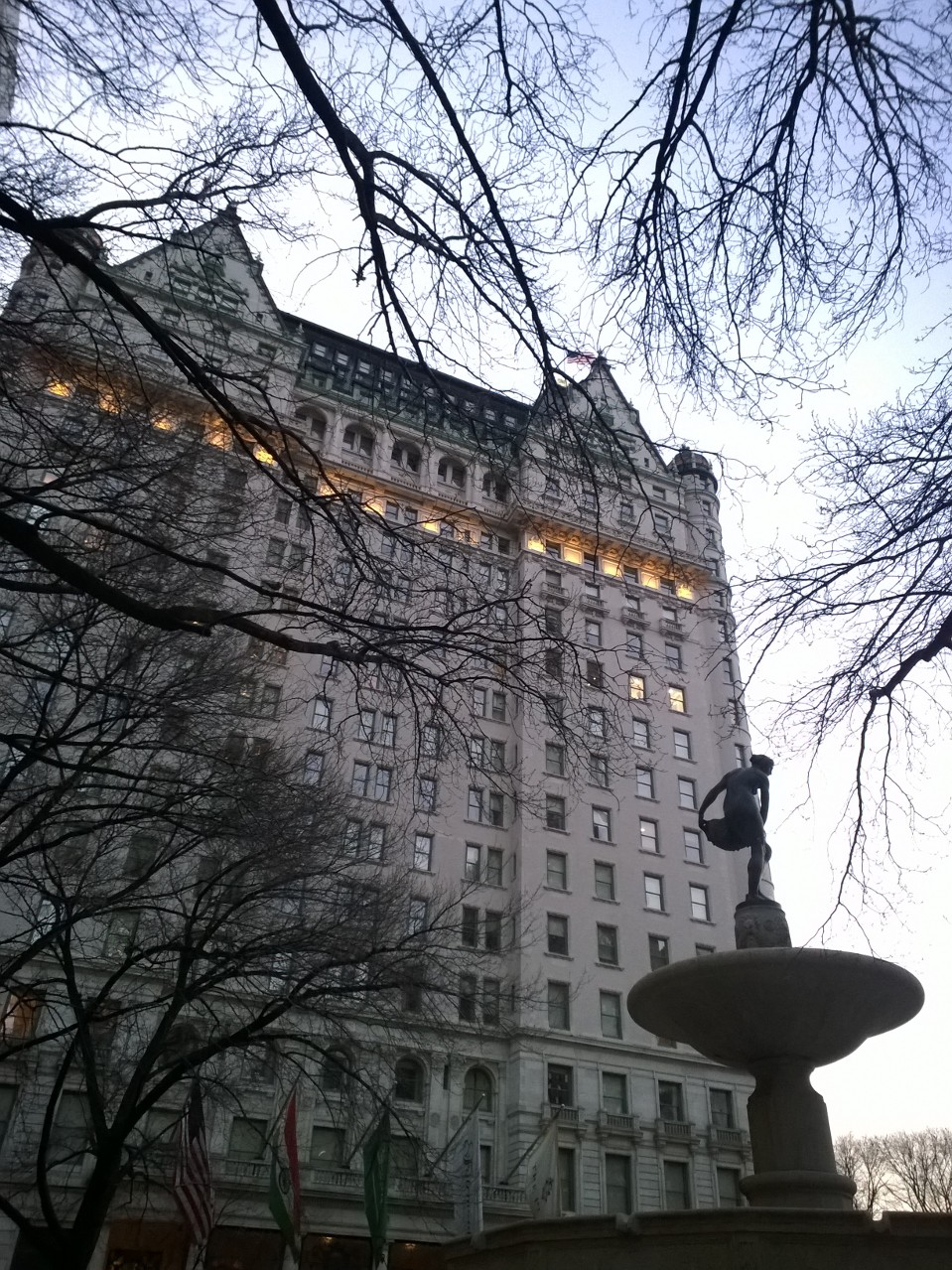
Designed in 1913 by Karl Bitter, the statue of Pomona atop the fountain represents abundance. In the background is the Plaza Hotel.

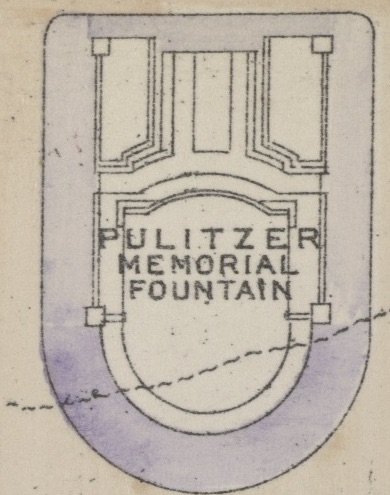
Fountain map in 1916

In December 1912, the executors of the estate of Joseph Pulitzer announced that New York City had approved the fountain's proposed location, in the plaza between 58th Street and 60th Street, just west of Fifth Avenue, the same plaza where the equestrian Sherman Monument stood since 1903. The executors invited five architecture firms to participate in a competition to determine the fountain's design, and to provide designs for a "good architectural treatment of the whole plaza."

In January 1913, the five schemes were exhibited at the New York Public Library, including the winning scheme, designed by Carrère and Hastings. Architect Thomas Hastings' design placed the fountain in the southern half of the plaza, whereas the Sherman Monument remained in the northern half (but moved fifteen feet west to be symmetrically opposite the fountain). Hastings' design for the fountain included a "symbolical figure-the exact symbolism not yet having been decided upon." Construction began in 1915, and by November, a newspaper reported: "The Pulitzer Fountain...is now finished and bubbling with the purest Croton water," noting that work on the northern portion of the plaza was delayed by subway construction.

In the executed design, Karl Bitter's allegorical bronze statue Pomona depicts the goddess of abundance holding a basket of fruit. The model was Doris Doscher. Because Bitter died on April 9, 1915, having just completed the plaster cast of the figure, Hastings and Bitter's widow selected Isidore Konti to complete the statue. Konti began work in the fall of 1915, and the statue was cast in April 1916. The statue was installed on (or about) May 1, 1916, "with little or no ceremony."

=== 1933–1935 restoration ===
In 1933, Herbert, Joseph and Ralph, sons of Joseph Pulitzer, donated $35,000 for the restoration of the fountain, to be done under the supervision of architect Dan Everett Waid. The work, delayed by labor troubles, was completed by June 1935. As part of the work, the limestone basin was rebuilt in Italian marble, and the limestone balustrade and columns that surrounded the fountain were demolished.

=== 1971 restoration and 1974 Landmarks Designation ===
In 1971, the Parks Department under the direction of August Heckscher, undertook a restoration of the fountain costing $268,000. The work included a new sewer system and the replacement of limestone steps with granite.

On May 30, 1974, the Landmarks Preservation Commission held a public hearing to consider designation of the Grand Army Plaza, including the Pulitzer Fountain, as a New York City scenic landmark. The measure was approved on July 23, 1974.

=== 1985–1990 restoration ===
On March 26, 1985, the Central Park Conservancy and the architecture firm of Buttrick White & Burtis presented plans to the Landmarks Preservation Commission for a full restoration of the plaza, including the Pulitzer Fountain. The plans called for the restoration of the balustrade and columns removed in the 1935 repairs. The work was completed in June 1990, including a reconstruction of the fountain, this time in granite. Plans to restore the balustrade and columns were abandoned on account of costs. According to The New York Times: "For years this fountain merely dripped and dribbled, but now it cascades, and that makes all the difference, for now the Pulitzer Fountain has a sound."

Most of the cost of the 1990 renovation was paid for by the Grand Army Plaza/Pulitzer Fountain partnership, a not-for-profit fund created by adjacent businesses and property owners. The fund made news in 2016 with the revelation that Donald Trump's charitable foundation had donated $264,000, its largest bequest ever, to the 1990 renovation. The bequest raised some eyebrows because the work indirectly benefited Trump's Plaza Hotel which stood across the street from the fountain.

In 2024, the second phase of the restoration project began. It is set to complete the comprehensive restoration of the south side by replacing the single row of Callery pear trees with a double row of the London plane trees, repairing and replacing deteriorating pavements consistent with the original plaza design and update the mechanical systems of the Pulitzer Fountain.

== Gallery ==
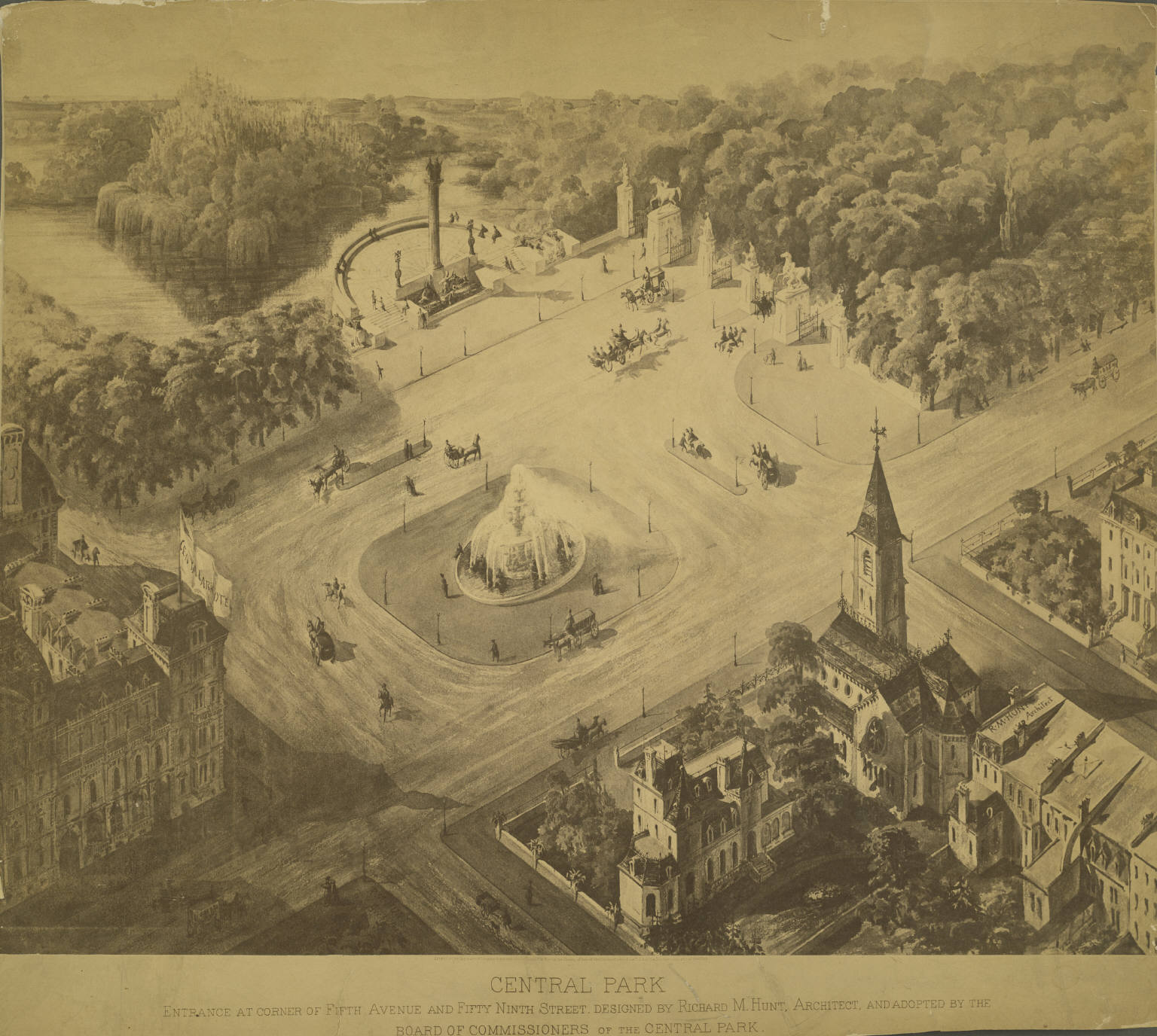
1863 design showing a proposed fountain (before the plaza was extended south to 58th Street)

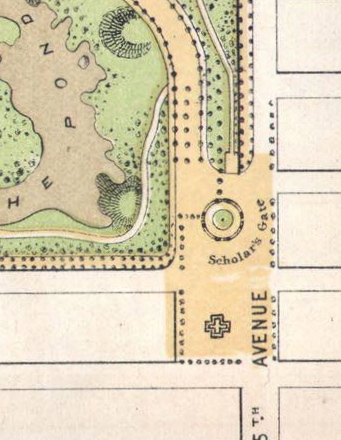
1868 map of Central Park includes the future site of the fountain.

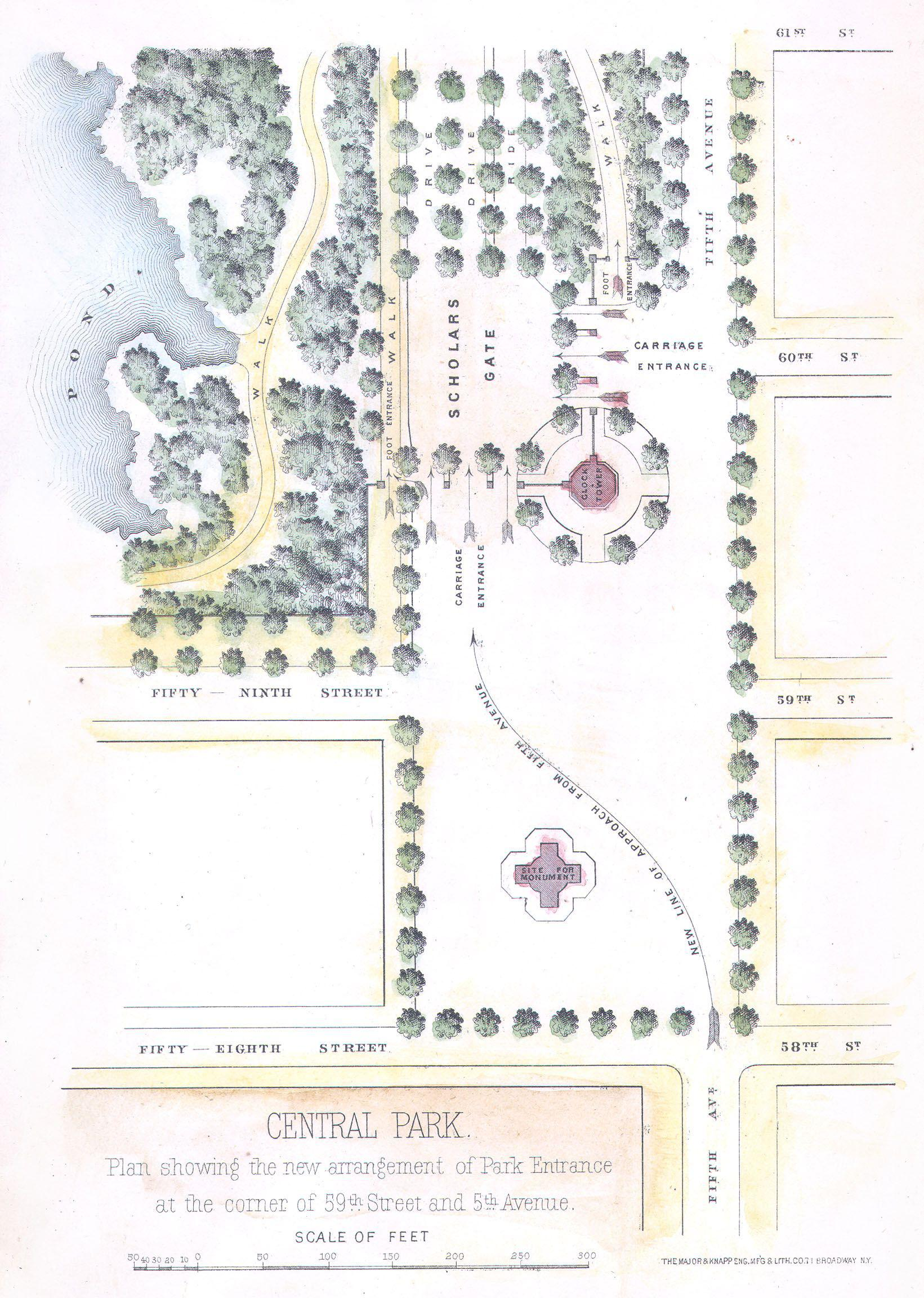
1869 map of the plaza, showing a site for a monument where the fountain was eventually built

Thomas Hasting's 1913 plan for the plaza, showing the Pulitzer Fountain in the southern (lower) half

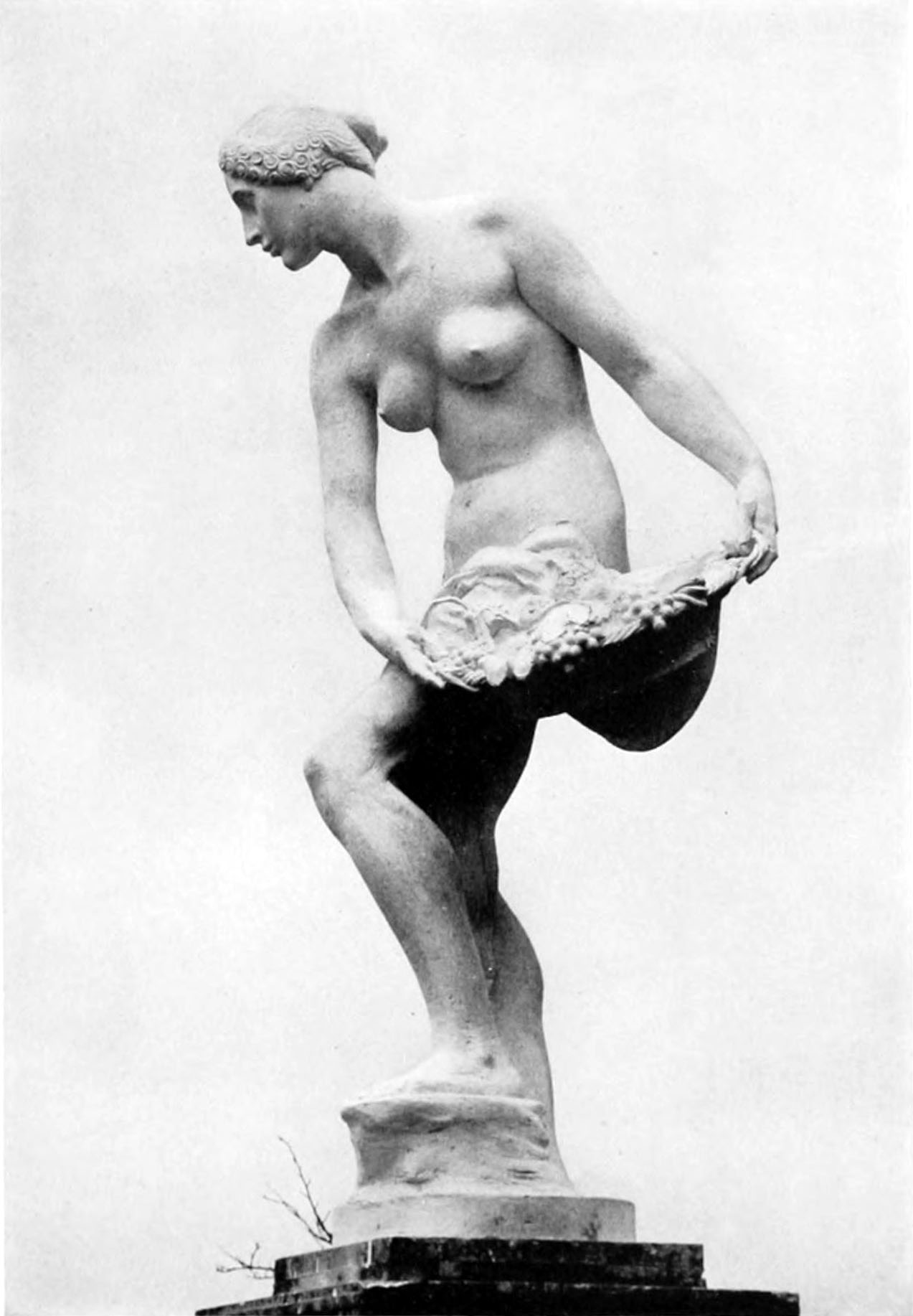
Karl Bitter's plaster 'sketch' of Pomona, 1915

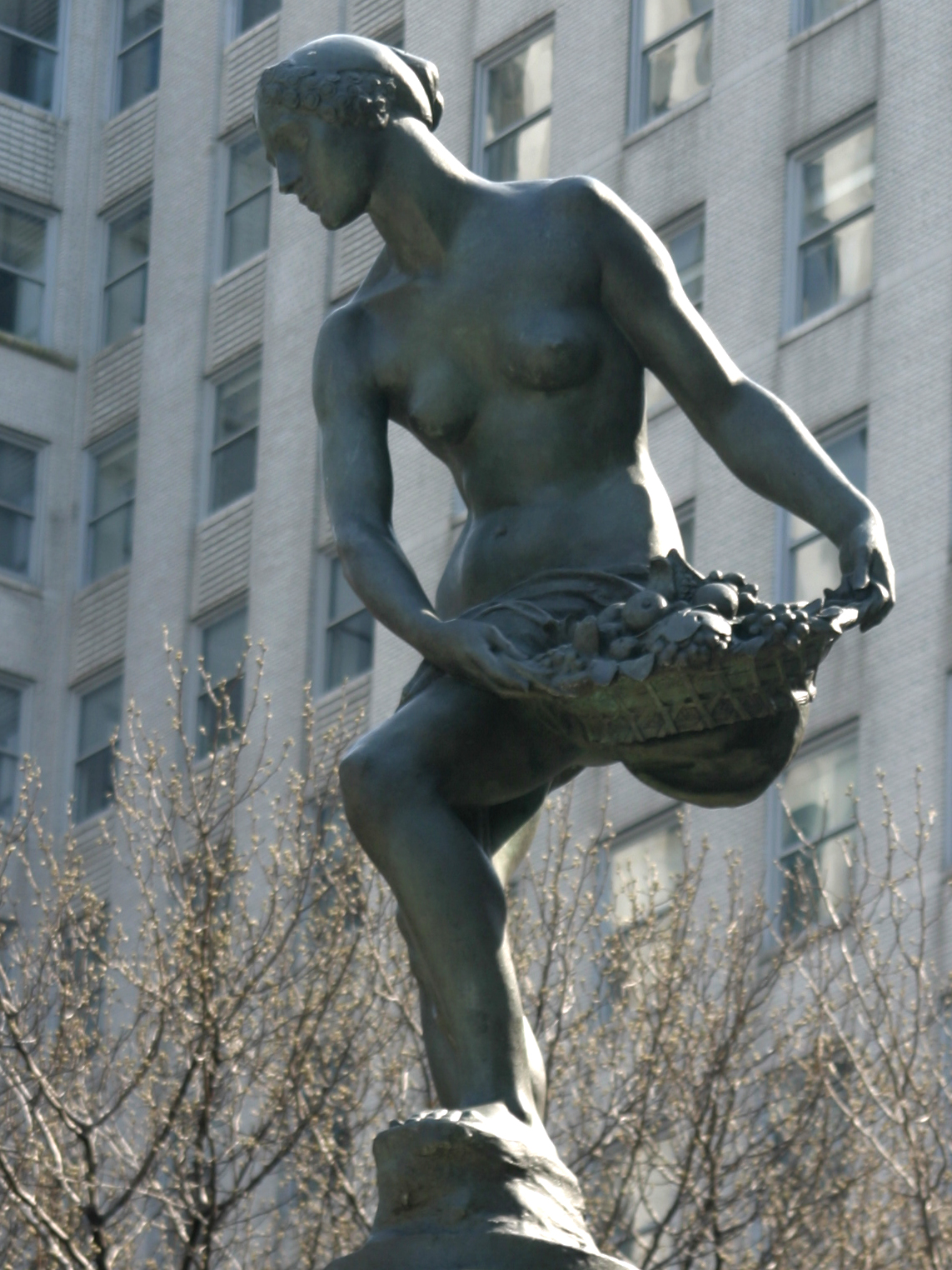
Pomona (in 2010) as executed in 1916 by Isidore Konti
