= New York City scenic landmarks =

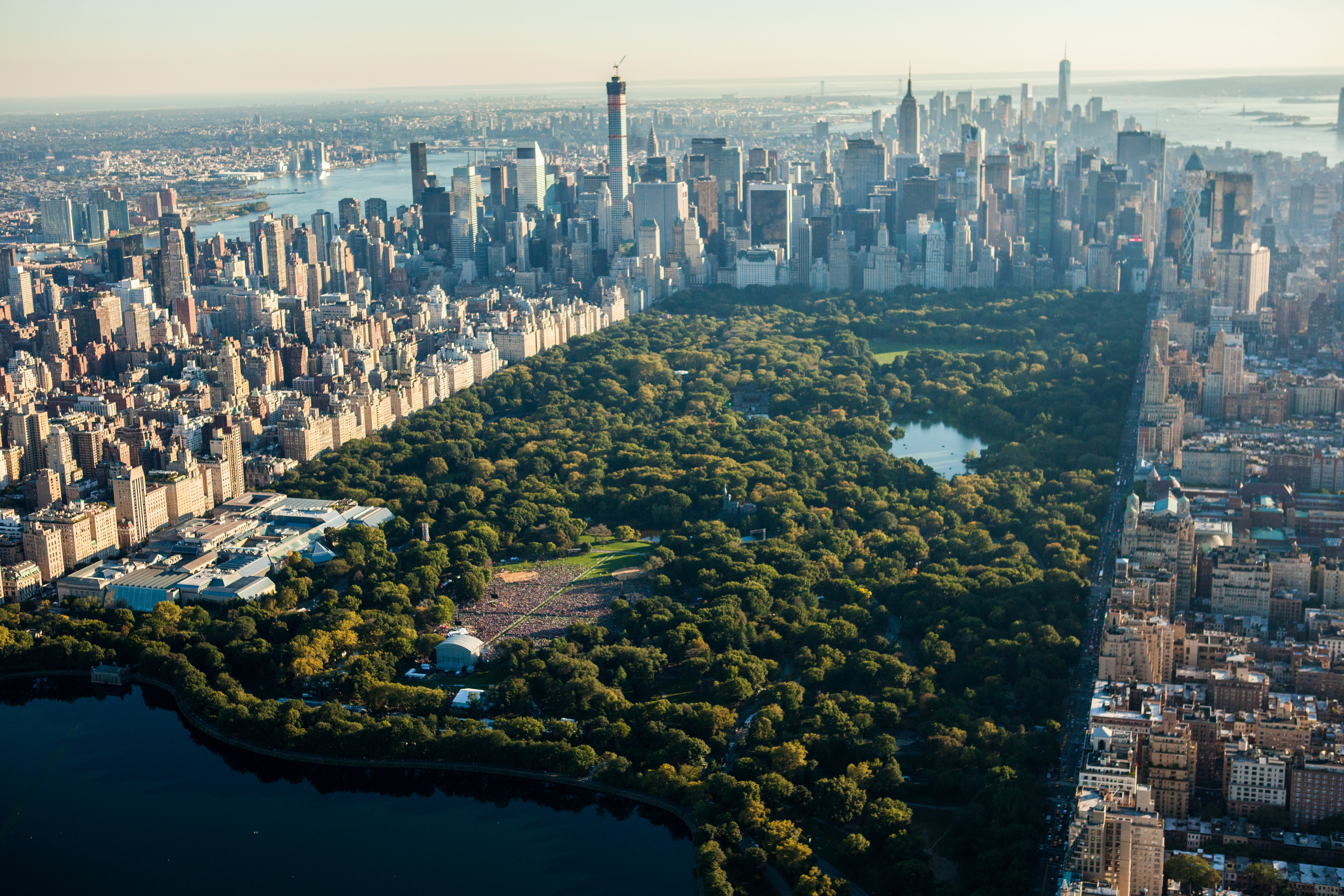
Central Park, the first scenic landmark to be designated in New York City

The New York City Landmarks Preservation Commission (LPC), which administers the city's Landmarks Preservation Law, has designated twelve scenic landmarks across three New York City boroughs. The scenic landmarks include public parks, plazas, and parkways operated by the New York City government. The LPC's rules dictate that scenic-landmark status may be granted to sites with "special character or special historical or aesthetic interest or value" to New York City, New York state, or the U.S. Seven of the twelve scenic landmarks were designated in the 1970s. The borough of Manhattan has the most scenic landmarks (with seven), Brooklyn has four scenic landmarks, and the Bronx has one. The first landmark to be designated was Central Park in Manhattan, and the most recent (as of 2024) is Aqueduct Walk in the Bronx.

== Background ==
The New York City Landmarks Preservation Commission (LPC) is the New York City governmental commission that administers the city's Landmarks Preservation Law. The commission administers four types of landmarks: individual landmarks, interior landmarks, scenic landmarks, and historic districts. Scenic landmarks are city-owned sites with "a special character or special historical or aesthetic interest or value" to New York City, New York state, or the U.S., which are also at least 30 years old. As of May 2024, the LPC has designated 12 scenic landmarks. Some landmarks are also on the National Register of Historic Places (NRHP), a separate program administered by the National Park Service.

New York City mayor Robert F. Wagner Jr. authorized the LPC to formally designate historic structures as landmarks in April 1965, and the LPC designated its first official landmarks in October 1965. Initially, only historic districts and the exteriors of buildings could be designated as landmarks. In 1973, mayor John Lindsay signed legislation that allowed the LPC to designate sites as scenic and interior landmarks.

The first scenic-landmark designation to be proposed was that of Central Park in the borough of Manhattan, which was formally designated on April 16, 1974. The LPC approved two additional scenic landmarks in Manhattan that year—Grand Army Plaza on July 23 and Bryant Park on November 12. Two more scenic landmarks were added on January 28, 1975: Verdi Square on Manhattan's Upper West Side, along with Ocean Parkway, the first scenic landmark in Brooklyn. These were followed by two additional landmarks in Brooklyn: Prospect Park became a scenic landmark on November 25, 1975, followed by Eastern Parkway on August 22, 1978. Riverside Park and the adjacent Riverside Drive on Manhattan's Upper West Side were designated as a single scenic landmark on February 19, 1980. After Fort Tryon Park in Washington Heights, Manhattan, was granted landmark status on September 20, 1983, no more scenic landmarks were designated for another 25 years.

Three scenic landmarks have been designated in the 21st century. Morningside Park, straddling the Morningside Heights and Harlem neighborhoods of Manhattan, was designated a New York City landmark on July 15, 2008. The LPC also named the Riegelmann Boardwalk in Coney Island, Brooklyn, as a landmark on May 15, 2018, after previously refusing to give landmark protection to the boardwalk. On April 16, 2024, Aqueduct Walk was designated as the first official scenic landmark in the borough of the Bronx. The designation of Aqueduct Walk coincided with the 50th anniversary of the LPC's first scenic landmark designation.

== Scenic landmarks ==
Scenic landmarks
Landmark name	Image	Date listed (Note: The number below each date is the number assigned to each location by the Landmarks Preservation Commission. The landmark designation report can be viewed by clicking the number.) (Note: For an interactive map, refer to "Discover New York City Landmarks". New York City Landmarks Preservation Commission – via ArcGIS.)	Location	Borough	Description
Bryant Park	Bryant Park	November 12, 1974 (#0879)	Bounded by 40th Street, Sixth Avenue, 42nd Street, and the western facade of the New York Public Library Main Branch; 40°45′14″N 73°59′01″W	Manhattan	A 9.6-acre (3.9 ha) park named after the journalist William Cullen Bryant and dating from 1847. The park contains a rectangular lawn surrounded by shaded walkways.
Central Park	Central Park	April 16, 1974 (#0851)	Bounded by 59th Street, Eighth Avenue, 110th Street, and Fifth Avenue; 40°46′57″N 73°57′58″W	Manhattan	An 843-acre (341 ha) park designed by Frederick Law Olmsted and Calvert Vaux as the United States' first large landscaped park, it was completed in 1876. The park contains landscape features such as lakes and woodlands, in addition to artistic and architectural elements such as gates, bridges, and sculptures. A network of paths meanders through the landscape.
Coney Island (Riegelmann) Boardwalk	Coney Island (Riegelmann) Boardwalk	May 15, 2018 (#2583)	Running from West 37th Street to Brighton 14th Street; 40°34′24″N 73°58′43″W	Brooklyn	A 2.7-mile (4.3 km) wooden boardwalk on the Coney Island shorefront, constructed from 1922 to 1941. The boardwalk measures 50 to 80 feet (15 to 24 m) wide and is made of various types of wood. Numerous amusement attractions are placed on the boardwalk.
Eastern Parkway	Eastern Parkway	August 22, 1978 (#0998)	Running from Grand Army Plaza to Ralph Avenue; 40°40′11″N 73°56′50″W	Brooklyn	A 3.8-mile-long (6.1 km), tree-lined parkway designed by Frederick Law Olmsted. It was completed in 1874 and extends eastward from Prospect Park. The parkway includes a central roadway, two service roads, and two medians with trees and pedestrian paths.
Fort Tryon Park	Fort Tryon Park	September 20, 1983 (#1417)	Bounded roughly by Dyckman Street, Broadway, Cabrini Boulevard, 190th Street, and Henry Hudson Parkway; 40°51′48″N 73°55′56″W	Manhattan	A 67-acre (27 ha) park on a ridge in Upper Manhattan. The park was created between 1931 and 1935 on land donated by John D. Rockefeller Jr. The park's design includes plantings, lawns, and pathways, in addition to the Cloisters museum.
Grand Army Plaza	Grand Army Plaza	July 23, 1974 (#0860)	Bounded by Fifth Avenue, 58th Street, Grand Army Plaza West, and 60th Street; 40°45′53″N 73°58′23″W	Manhattan	A 0.62-acre (0.25 ha) plaza, designed by Carrère and Hastings and completed in 1916 at the southeastern corner of Central Park. The plaza is centered around an equestrian statue of William Tecumseh Sherman on its northern half and the Pulitzer Fountain on its southern half.
Morningside Park	Morningside Park	July 15, 2008 (#2254)	Bounded by Morningside Drive, Amsterdam Avenue, 123rd Street, Morningside Avenue, Manhattan Avenue, and 110th Street; 40°48′23″N 73°57′31″W	Manhattan	A 30-acre (12 ha) park along a natural bluff in Upper Manhattan, designed by Frederick Law Olmsted and Calvert Vaux. It was completed in 1895. The park includes an artificial ornamental pond and waterfall, rock outcroppings, three sculptures, and paths.
Ocean Parkway	Ocean Parkway	January 28, 1975 (#0871)	Running from Church Avenue to Sea Breeze Avenue; 40°36′53″N 73°58′07″W	Brooklyn	A 5-mile (8.0 km), tree-lined parkway designed by Frederick Law Olmsted. It was completed in 1876 and extends southward from Prospect Park. The parkway includes a central roadway, two service roads, and two medians with trees and pedestrian paths.
Old Croton Aqueduct Walk	Old Croton Aqueduct Walk	April 16, 2024 (#2673)	Running from 179th Street to Kingsbridge Road; 40°51′45″N 73°54′15″W	Bronx	A 4.9-mile (7.9 km) linear park along the route of the Old Croton Aqueduct, which operated as an aqueduct from 1852 to 1955. The land alongside the aqueduct has been used as a park since 1930. It includes playgrounds, athletic courts, and a path.
Prospect Park	Prospect Park	November 25, 1975 (#0903)	Bounded by Prospect Park Southwest, Prospect Park West, Flatbush Avenue, Ocean Avenue, and Parkside Avenue; 40°39′45″N 73°58′10″W	Brooklyn	A 526-acre (213 ha) park designed by Frederick Law Olmsted and Calvert Vaux. It was substantially completed in 1873. The park is divided into three landscaped regions and contains structures such as a boathouse, a shelter, and two historic houses. A network of paths meanders through the landscape.
Riverside Park and Riverside Drive	Riverside Park and Riverside Drive	January 22, 1980 (#2002)	Bounded by 72nd Street, the Hudson River, St. Clair Place, and the easternmost roadway of Riverside Drive; 40°48′01″N 73°58′25″W	Manhattan	Riverside Park, and Riverside Drive at its eastern border, were both designed by Frederick Law Olmsted and Calvert Vaux starting in the 1870s. The original park covers 191 acres (77 ha) and was redesigned and expanded to 293 acres (119 ha) in the 1930s. Paths, plantings, and play areas are placed on four tiers, which slope downward from Riverside Drive to the Hudson River.
Verdi Square	Verdi Square	January 28, 1975 (#0857)	Bounded by Broadway, 73rd Street, Amsterdam Avenue, and 72nd Street; 40°46′45″N 73°58′54″W	Manhattan	A 0.10-acre (0.040 ha) park acquired in 1887. It is named for the composer Giuseppe Verdi and is centered around the Giuseppe Verdi Monument, dedicated in 1906.

== Sources ==
- Diamonstein-Spielvogel, Barbaralee (2011). The Landmarks of New York (5th ed.). State University of New York Press. ISBN 978-1-4384-3769-9.
- Sagalyn, Lynne B. (2023). Times Square Remade: The Dynamics of Urban Change. MIT Press. ISBN 978-0-262-37632-7. Archived from the original on May 25, 2024.
- Stern, Robert A. M.; Mellins, Thomas; Fishman, David (1995). New York 1960: Architecture and Urbanism Between the Second World War and the Bicentennial. Monacelli Press. ISBN 1-885254-02-4. OCLC 32159240. OL 1130718M.
- Taylor, Dorceta E. (2009). "section 3". The Environment and the People in American Cities, 1600s–1900s: Disorder, Inequality, and Social Change. Duke University Press. ISBN 978-0-8223-4451-3.
