= Grand Army Plaza (Manhattan) =

Plaza in Manhattan, New York

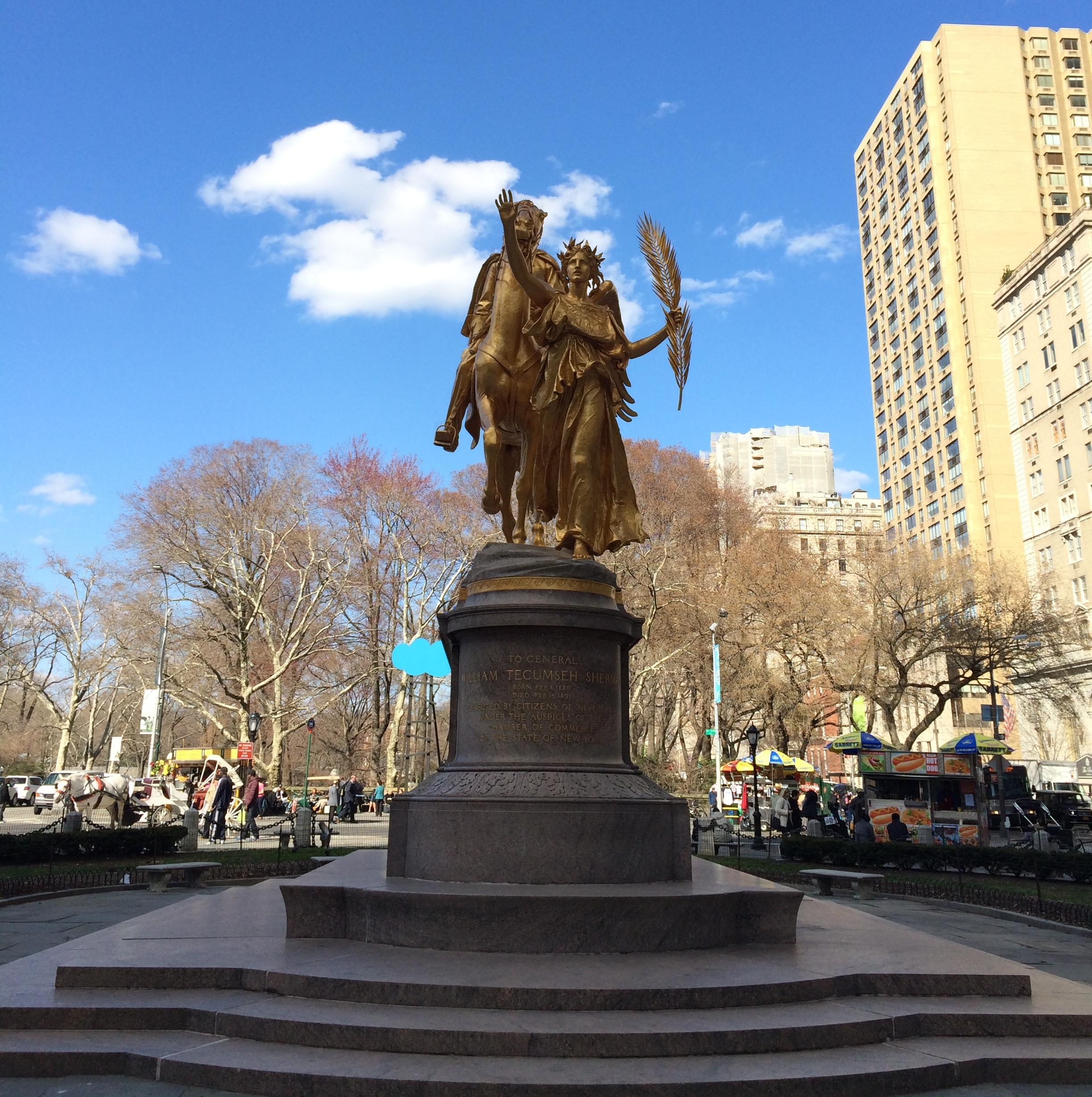
- William Tecumseh Sherman, northern side of plaza
- Map of notable buildings and structures at Central Park. Pan and zoom the map and click on points for more details.
- Former names: Fifth Avenue Plaza, Central Park Plaza
- Namesake: Grand Army of the Republic
- Type: Square
- Owner: Government of New York City
- Maintained by: New York City Department of Parks and Recreation
- Area: 0.62 acres (27,000 ft^{2}; 2,500 m^{2})
- Location: Manhattan
- Coordinates: 40°45′52″N 73°58′24″W
- Major junctions: 59th Street
- North: 60th Street
- East: Fifth Avenue
- South: 58th Street
- West: Grand Army Plaza West

Construction
- Commissioned: 1911
- Construction start: 1915
- Inauguration: 1916

Other
- Designer: Carrère and Hastings
- Status: City scenic landmark

New York City Landmark
- Designated: July 23, 1974
- Reference no.: 0860

Grand Army Plaza (formerly Fifth Avenue Plaza and Central Park Plaza) is a public square at the southeast corner of Central Park in Manhattan, New York City, near the intersection of Fifth Avenue and Central Park South (59th Street). It consists of two rectangular plots on the west side of Fifth Avenue between 58th and 60th streets. The current design of Grand Army Plaza dates to a 1916 reconstruction by the architectural firm of Carrère and Hastings. The plaza is designated as a New York City scenic landmark.

The plaza is bisected by Central Park South (59th Street). The centerpiece of the plaza's northern half, carved out of the southeastern corner of Central Park, is the equestrian statue of William Tecumseh Sherman, sculpted by Augustus Saint-Gaudens. The principal feature of the plaza's southern half is the Pulitzer Fountain, topped with a bronze statue of the Roman goddess Pomona sculpted by Karl Bitter. The area around Grand Army Plaza was largely residential in the late 19th century, with several hotels. Though the surrounding area was redeveloped into a commercial neighborhood in the 20th century, the plaza is still surrounded by hotels such as the Plaza Hotel and the Sherry-Netherland.

The northern half of Grand Army Plaza was planned in 1858 as one of four entrance plazas at Central Park's corners, and it was expanded south in 1868. Several proposals for the plaza in the 19th century were not executed. The idea for a unified treatment of the plaza was first proposed by Karl Bitter in 1898, and the Sherman statue was dedicated in the northern half of the plaza in 1903. After the newspaper publisher Joseph Pulitzer died in 1911, the entire plaza was redesigned, and a memorial fountain was installed in 1916. The plaza was rededicated in 1924 in honor of the Grand Army of the Republic, although it was rarely known by its official name. Grand Army Plaza was refurbished in the 1930s when the Pulitzer Fountain was rebuilt, and the fountain was rebuilt again in 1971. The plaza received another major restoration in the 1980s, and the northern half was renovated in the 2010s.

== Site ==
Grand Army Plaza is one of four monumental plazas placed at the corners of Central Park in Manhattan, New York City. (Note: The others are Columbus Circle to the southwest of Central Park, Duke Ellington Circle to the northeast, and Frederick Douglass Circle to the northwest.) The plaza is bounded on the north by 60th Street, which contains the Scholar's Gate entrance to Central Park. Along the western edge are the Pond and Hallett Nature Sanctuary to the northwest and the Plaza Hotel to the southwest. The plaza's southern border, on 58th Street, contains the Paris Theatre, Bergdorf Goodman Building, and Solow Building. At the southeast corner is the Squibb Building at 745 Fifth Avenue, which contained an FAO Schwarz toy store for much of the 20th century. To the east is Fifth Avenue, on which the General Motors Building, the Sherry-Netherland hotel, Park Cinq, and Metropolitan Club (from south to north) are located. The Pierre Hotel is located just north of the plaza, and the New York City Subway's Fifth Avenue–59th Street station is directly underneath. The region around Grand Army Plaza has been referred to as the "Plaza district".

=== Development history ===
In the late 19th century, the area around the plaza had several Gilded Age mansions. Mary Mason Jones developed "Marble Row" on Fifth Avenue between 57th and 58th streets in the late 1860s, and Cornelius Vanderbilt II built his 58th Street mansion on the southern side of the plaza in 1882. Hotels were also developed around the Fifth Avenue Plaza in the late 19th century. The politician Boss Tweed and several associates unsuccessfully tried to develop a hotel on the east side of the plaza, which was abandoned in 1874 after Tweed fell from power. The original Plaza Hotel was built on the west side of the Fifth Avenue Plaza starting in 1883, and it was completed in 1890. It was followed by the Savoy and New Netherland hotels on the northeast and southeast corners of Fifth Avenue and 59th Street, respectively, in 1892. The last vacant lot surrounding the plaza, at the northeast corner of Fifth Avenue and 58th Street, was developed in 1894. The original Plaza Hotel was replaced in 1907 with the current Plaza Hotel.

By the 1900s, the eastern side of Grand Army Plaza included the Savoy and New Netherland hotels, in addition to a bank and an apartment house. Apartments around the plaza tended to be high-priced at the time. Although the area to the south had become a commercial area, there were upscale residences to the north. During the 20th century, the area around the plaza was known for its hotels and high-end retail. By the time the Vanderbilt mansion was demolished and replaced with the Bergdorf Goodman Building in 1927, the area was almost fully commercial. The same year, the Savoy-Plaza Hotel was built on the eastern side of the plaza between 58th and 59th streets, and the Sherry-Netherland was developed immediately to the north.

In the two decades after World War II, dozens of apartment and office buildings were erected on the blocks surrounding Grand Army Plaza. Along the plaza itself, the Paris Theatre opened at the south end of the plaza in 1948. Five apartment buildings were developed around Grand Army Plaza in the early 1960s, and the Savoy-Plaza was replaced by the General Motors Building in the mid-1960s. The demolition of the Savoy-Plaza resulted in a preservation movement to save the hotels around Grand Army Plaza. The New York City Planning Commission rezoned a three-block area around Grand Army Plaza in 1968, which prevented the construction of further office buildings around the plaza. By the late 20th century, the plaza separated the upscale residential neighborhoods and Museum Mile to the north from the upscale shopping districts to the south.

== Monuments and plaza ==
Grand Army Plaza has an area of approximately 0.62 acres (27,000 ft^{2}; 2,500 m^{2}). The current plaza dates to a 1916 redesign by Carrère and Hastings. The plaza is bisected by Central Park South (59th Street), with an equestrian statue of William Tecumseh Sherman on its northern half and the Pulitzer Fountain on its southern half. There is disagreement over whether the plaza is part of Central Park. The New York City Department of Parks and Recreation (NYC Parks) does not consider the plaza to be part of Central Park, although there are sources that consider the plaza to be part of the park.

The plaza is a loading area for the horse-drawn carriages that travel through Central Park. Grand Army Plaza has also hosted various events throughout its history. For instance, starting in 1920, concerts were hosted in the plaza at night, and the Grand Army of the Republic also hosted annual ceremonies at the plaza's Sherman statue. In addition, the Pulitzer Fountain was lit during the Christmas holiday season during the mid-20th century. Starting in 1977, a menorah has been placed on or near the plaza every Hanukkah; the menorah is 28 feet (8.5 m) wide and 32 feet (9.8 m) tall. Since 2006, it has held the Guinness World Record for the world's largest menorah, even though it is smaller than a similar menorah in Brooklyn's Grand Army Plaza.

=== Northern section ===
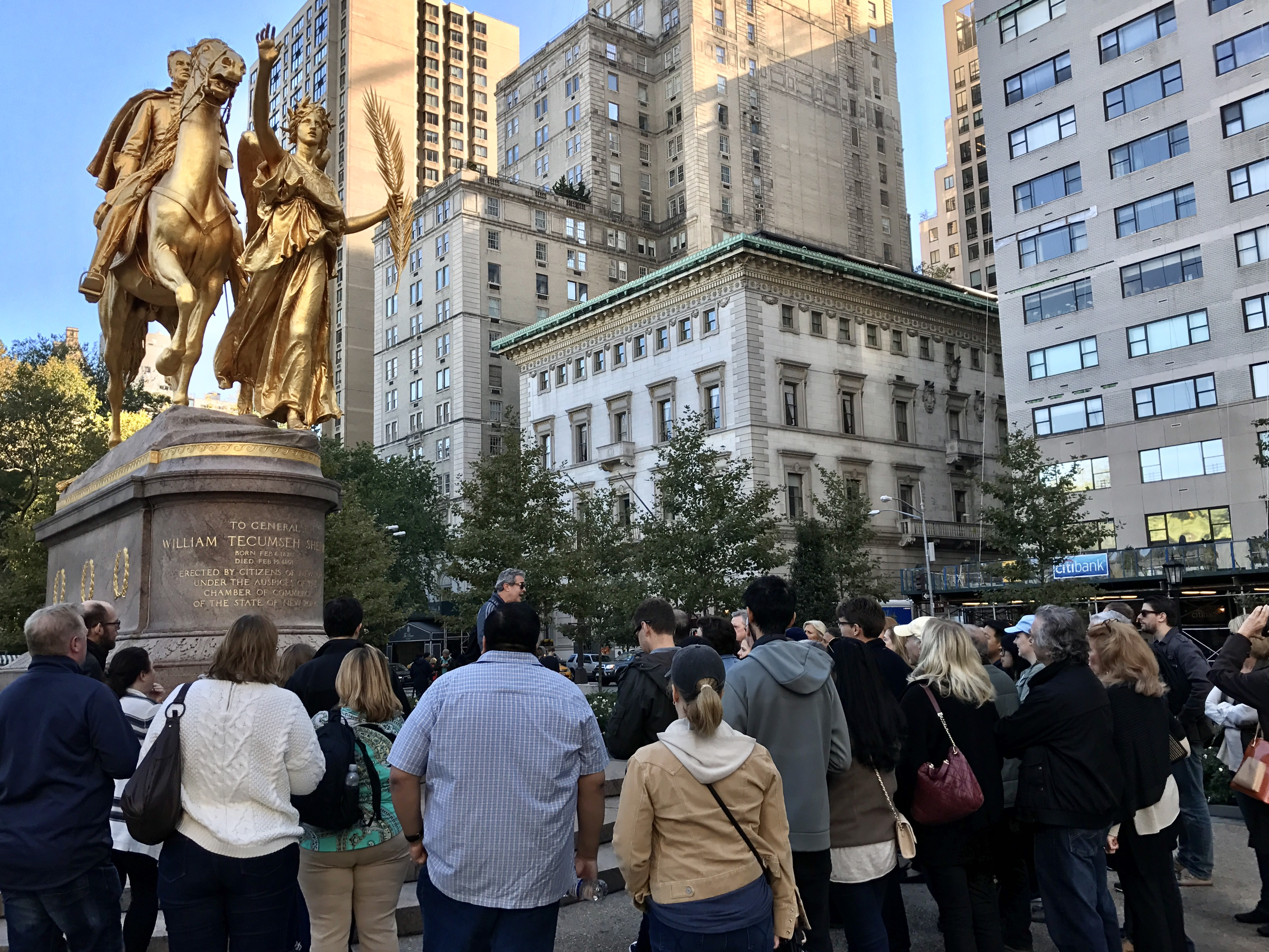
The Sherman statue (left), with a crowd around it. The Metropolitan Club can be seen in the background.

The centerpiece of the plaza's northern half, at the southeastern corner of Central Park, is the equestrian statue of William Tecumseh Sherman by Augustus Saint-Gaudens. The gilded-bronze monument consists of an equestrian statue of Sherman, which is coated in 23.5-karat gold. Next to the Sherman figure is Victory, an allegorical female figure of the Greek goddess Nike, which is based on the likeness of the model Hettie Anderson. The figure's right hand reaches forward, while her left hand carries a palm branch. The statues are set on a Stony Creek granite pedestal designed by the architect Charles Follen McKim, measuring 42.5 by 30.67 feet (13 by 9 m) wide. Saint-Gaudens had been hired in 1892 to design the sculpture; the casting of the statue was displayed at the Exposition Universelle in 1900, but the statue was not installed until 1903. There is a trap door under the monument as well to allow maintenance workers to repair the statue's interior. Lampposts and benches are arranged around the monument. As of 2015, the northern half of the plaza is flanked by two rows of London planes.

Also in the northern section of Grand Army Plaza, at 60th Street near Fifth Avenue, is the Scholars Gate entrance to Central Park. Next to Scholars' Gate is Doris C. Freedman Plaza, named in honor of arts activist and administrator Doris Freedman in 1981. Within Doris C. Freedman Plaza are temporary sculptural art installations presented by the Public Art Fund. Over the years, artists such as Henry Moore, Isamu Noguchi, Louise Nevelson, and George Segal have displayed work at Freedman Plaza. There is also a commemorative plaque measuring 1.33 by 1.75 feet (0.41 by 0.53 m), which was donated by Freedman's daughter Susan Freedman.

=== Southern section ===
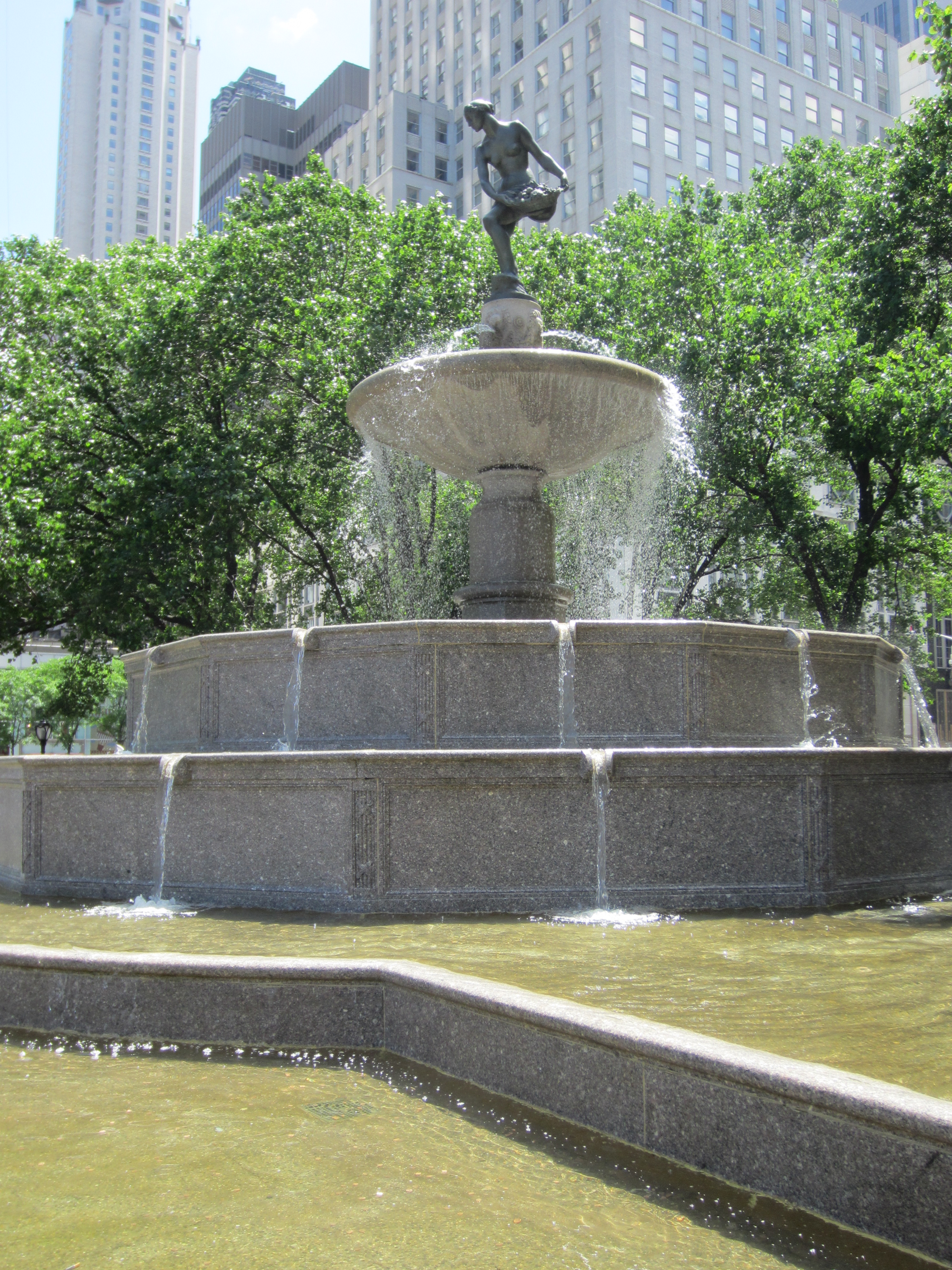
The Pulitzer Fountain

The principal feature of the plaza's southern half is the Pulitzer Fountain, topped with a bronze statue of the Roman goddess Pomona sculpted by Karl Bitter. The sculpture depicts the goddess of abundance holding a basket of fruit and is modeled after Doris Doscher. Bitter died in 1915 after completing the plaster cast of the figure, and Isidore Konti completed the statue. The fountain contains six basins, which gradually decrease in size toward the top. The largest, lowest basin measures 68 feet (21 m) wide at the base and 20.5 feet (6.2 m) high. The three lowest basins are curved, while the two basins above them are polygonal. The statue of abundance rises above the topmost, circular basin. There are also scallop figures and mythical creatures carved into the western and eastern sides of the fountain. The fountain is higher at its south end, so water flows toward the north. The limestone basins were rebuilt in Italian marble in the 1930s and then replaced with granite in the 1970s. Various trees and paved areas surround the fountain.

== History ==
=== 19th and early 20th century ===
==== Creation and early years ====
Until the 19th century, a stream traveled through what is now the site of Grand Army Plaza, extending from the Upper West Side east to the East River; the Pond in Central Park is a remnant of this stream. The landscape architects Frederick Law Olmsted and Calvert Vaux won a contest to design Central Park in 1858, and the park was completed in 1876. The design included entrance plazas at each corner of the park. At the southeastern corner was the plaza on Fifth Avenue between 59th and 60th streets, which was recessed into the corner of the park. The original plaza contained no decorations at all, and there were also loading areas for horse-drawn carriages along the nearby stretch of Central Park South. The space was variously called the Fifth Avenue Plaza, the Central Park Plaza, or just "the Plaza". At the time, the Fifth Avenue Plaza was located on the outskirts of New York City and was surrounded by shacks.

Central Park's commissioners, who did not like the Fifth Avenue Plaza's sparse decoration, began soliciting plans to decorate the plaza in the 1860s. The architect Richard Morris Hunt proposed that decorative gates be installed at Central Park's entrances, including the Fifth Avenue Plaza. The gateway, at Fifth Avenue and 60th Street, would have been 200 feet (61 m) wide, with five portals separated by rows of elm trees. There would have been sculptures on decorative pedestals, in addition to a semicircular landing on the plaza's western end, which would have overlooked the Pond in Central Park. The landing would have included a column measuring 50 feet (15 m) tall, with sculptures representing the explorer Henry Hudson and the East and Hudson rivers, as well as a waterfall leading to the Pond. There would also have been a fountain within the plaza itself. The gateway was not installed because of opposition from Vaux, who believed that gates were not appropriate for a park that was supposed to be open to all.

Central Park's commissioners acquired land on the western side of Fifth Avenue between 58th and 59th Streets in 1868 to provide "a more capacious entrance" to Central Park. Simultaneously, the commissioners created a street on the western boundary of the site. At the time, Fifth Avenue was a two-way street, so the expanded plaza provided access for northbound traffic on Fifth Avenue.

During the late 19th century, the Fifth Avenue Plaza was used almost entirely by vehicles. There was a cross-shaped traffic island to the south of 59th Street and a larger traffic circle to the north of that street. Boss Tweed's Tammany Hall political machine took over control of Central Park in 1870. The park commission, published a report the next year questioning the utility of the plaza's southern half. The plaza was originally paved in asphalt, but in 1886, part of the plaza was repaved with granite-block pavement. This prompted a taxpayers' group to request in 1887 that the New York City Department of Parks and Recreation (NYC Parks) repave the rest of the plaza. NYC Parks subsequently approved a contract in 1887 to add granite pavement to the southern half of the plaza, as well as new crosswalks in the plaza.

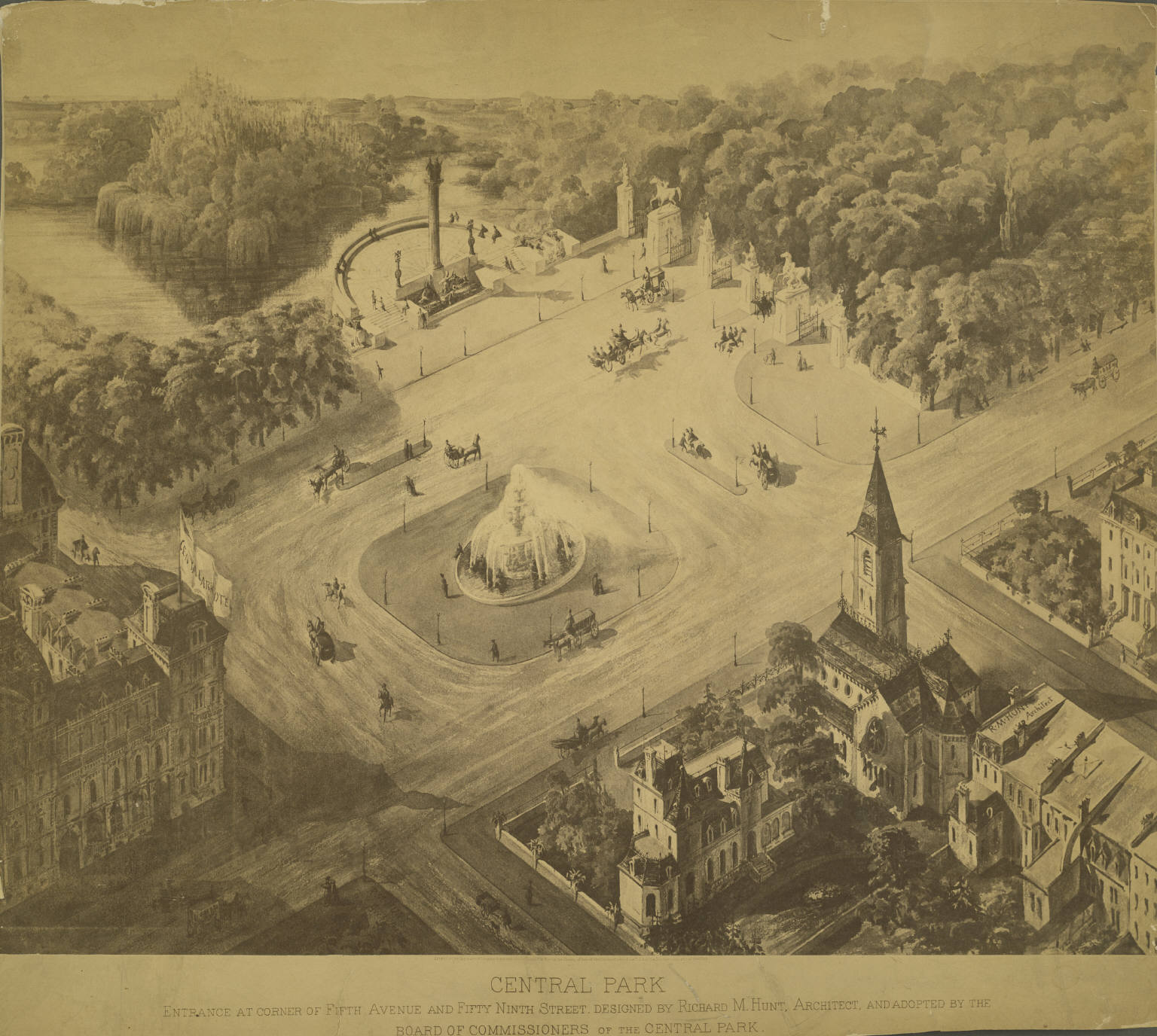
1863 design showing a proposed fountain (before the plaza was extended south to 58th Street).

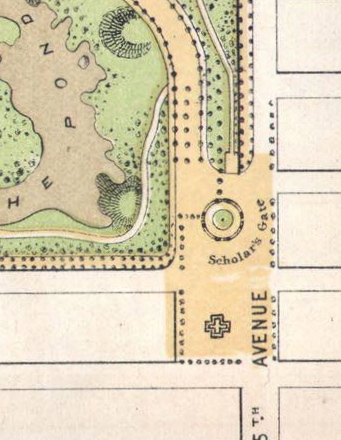
1868 Map of Central Park illustrates the expanded plaza.

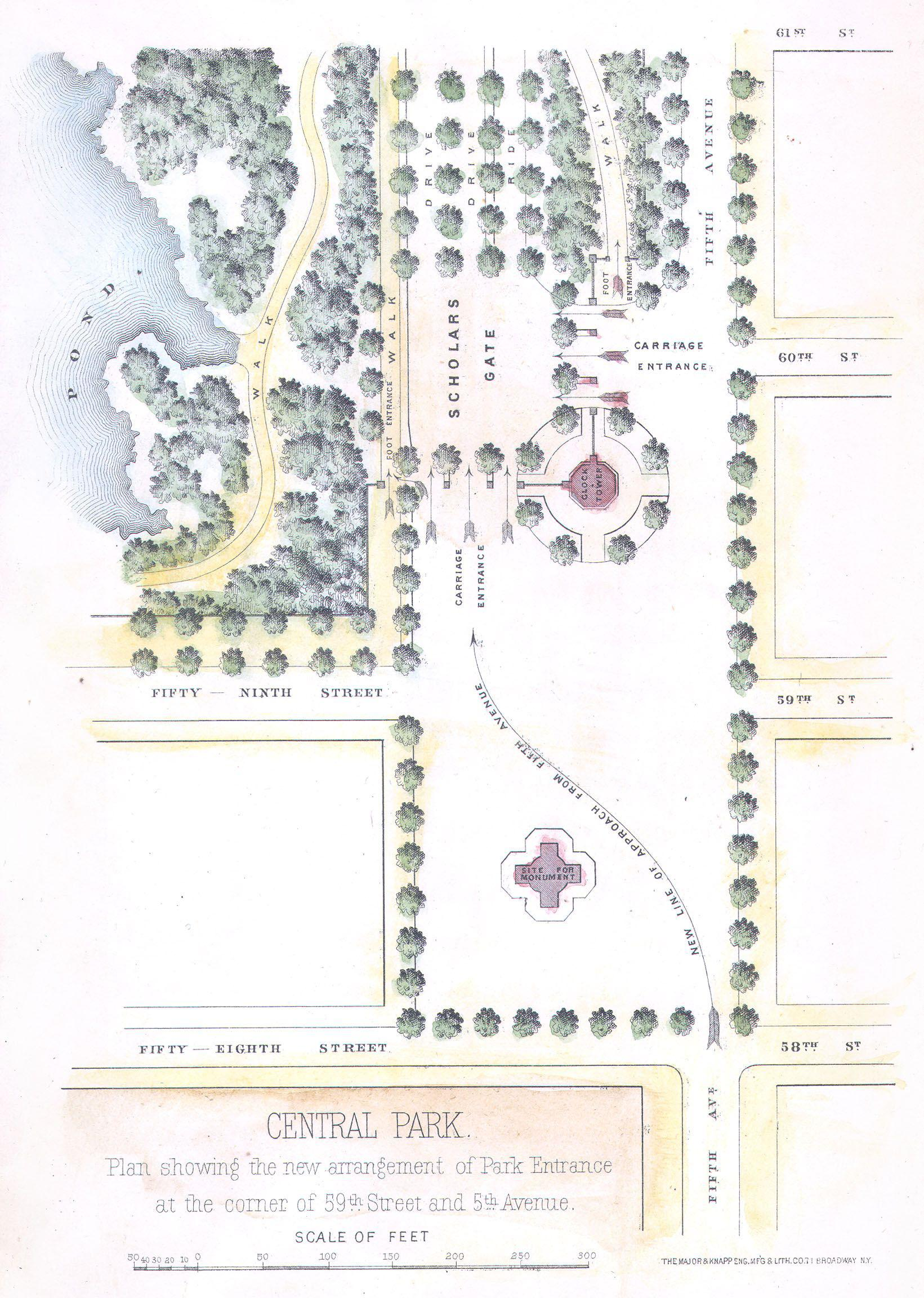
1869 map of the plaza, showing a proposed monument where the Pulitzer Fountain was eventually built.

==== 1890s to 1910s plans ====
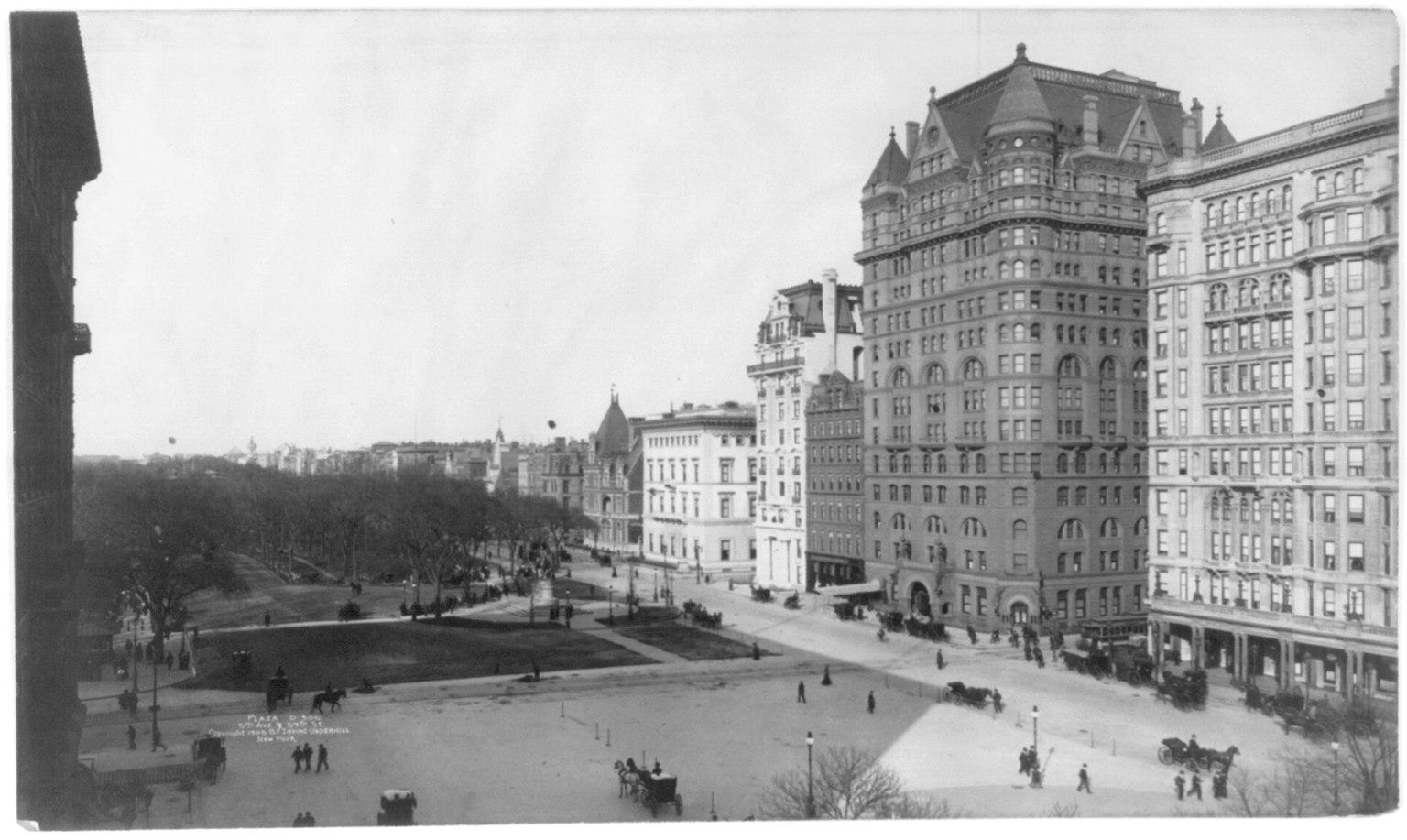
1905 photo, before improvements

In late 1895, the Architectural League of New York proposed erecting a gateway to honor Richard Morris Hunt, reusing many components of his 1860s proposal for the plaza. The gateway would have contained two equestrian statues and four sculptures, but it was canceled due to public opposition and high costs. Simultaneously, there was a proposal to build the Soldiers' and Sailors' Monument in the Fifth Avenue Plaza; the Fine Arts Federation opposed the plan, saying the monument would be overshadowed by nearby buildings. The commissioners of the Soldiers' and Sailors' Monument hired Stoughton & Stoughton to design the monument in November 1897, but the National Sculpture Society refused to allow the monument to be erected in the Fifth Avenue Plaza. The city's Municipal Art Commission voted in December 1897 to ban the monument from being constructed in the Fifth Avenue Plaza, and the monument was subsequently moved to Riverside Park, where it was completed in 1903.

Karl Bitter proposed redesigning the plaza in 1897 or 1898. By then, there was wider support for renovating the plaza, in part due to the rise of the City Beautiful movement. Bitter's plan called for the northern and southern halves of the plaza to be designed in a symmetrical manner, with balustrades, benches, statues, and fountains in either half. G. T. Taylor devised plans for a "fountain on a noble scale" in the southern half of the plaza, though city officials paid little notice to his proposal. The next year, there were proposals to construct a memorial arch in honor of George Dewey, who had been victorious in the 1898 Battle of Manila Bay. The architect Charles Follen McKim and sculptor Augustus Saint-Gaudens decided in 1902 to install an equestrian statue of U.S. Army general William Tecumseh Sherman in Central Park. McKim and Saint-Gaudens decided to install the sculpture in the Fifth Avenue Plaza after having contemplated several sites on the Upper West Side. The statue was dedicated in the northern half of the plaza on May 30, 1903, at the end of a Memorial Day parade. To make way for the statue, the city's Municipal Art Commission notified NYC Parks that two large trees at the plaza's northern end had to be felled.

In 1906, the city's traffic commissioners changed the flow of traffic around the plaza. Previously, only northbound traffic could use Fifth Avenue from 58th to 60th Street, but southbound traffic was also allowed to use Fifth Avenue under the new regulations; in addition, traffic from Central Park began traveling southeast through the plaza to reach Fifth Avenue. There was a suggestion in 1908 to install a monument to President Abraham Lincoln at the plaza. There were several proposals for new or enlarged streets to the plaza as well. One proposal in the 1900s entailed a wide parkway from the plaza east to the Queensboro Bridge, running in between 59th and 60th streets, in the 1900s. In addition, the architect Charles Rollinson Lamb suggested a new avenue extending from the Fifth Avenue Plaza to Times Square in 1911. A commission appointed by Manhattan borough president George McAneny suggested in 1912 that the Fifth Avenue Plaza be redesigned "on dignified and orderly lines" and that a taxicab stand be added to the plaza.

=== 1910s redesign ===
Thomas Hastings's 1913 plaza plan, with the Sherman Monument in the northern (upper) half, and the Pulitzer Fountain in the southern (lower) half.

The newspaper publisher Joseph Pulitzer died in 1911 and bequeathed $50,000 for the creation of a memorial fountain, though this bequest was reduced due to a state tax levied upon it. Pulitzer specified that the fountain was to resemble those on the Place de la Concorde in Paris, and he preferred that the fountain be built in the Fifth Avenue Plaza near 59th Street. There were proposals to use the funding for a wider-ranging redesign of the Fifth Avenue Plaza, but Pulitzer's family would not allocate any further funds for that purpose. NYC Parks' landscape architect Charles Downing Lay began studying the Fifth Avenue Plaza in 1911, and he submitted plans for the plaza's redesign to NYC Parks' commissioner in December 1912. Lay's plans included relocating the Sherman Monument south and installing the Pulitzer Fountain at the southern end of the plaza's southern half. That month, the city approved the Pulitzer estate's plans to donate a fountain to the plaza. The estate's executors hosted an architectural design competition for the fountain, inviting five firms. Charles A. Platt, Paul Philippe Cret, Herbert Adams, George B. Post, and Whitney Warren were asked to review the contest submissions.

The judges selected a scheme by Thomas Hastings of Carrère and Hastings in January 1913, (Note: The other designers in the competition were McKim, Mead & White; Arnold W. Brunner; John Russell Pope; and Harold Van Buren Magonigle.) which was displayed at the New York Public Library Main Branch. Hastings's design placed the fountain in the southern half of the plaza. The streets on all sides of the plaza would be widened. The Sherman Monument would be relocated about 16 feet (4.9 m) west, placing it in the center of the plaza's northern half. A balustrade and plantings would be added around the Sherman Monument, and a strip of grass on the north side of 58th Street would be removed. Plane trees would be planted on all sides of the plaza, and a shelter building with restrooms would be built in the northern half of the plaza, overlooking the Pond. Early plans called for the plaza's trees to be pruned so they would be shaped like cubes, though these were not planted. Traffic around the plaza would be adjusted so that traffic entering Central Park would use 60th Street, while traffic leaving the park would use the plaza's western roadway and turn on 58th Street.

Concurrently with the plaza's renovation, the Brooklyn Rapid Transit Company (BRT) had drawn out plans for the Broadway Line subway tunnel, with a station at Fifth Avenue–59th Street. Hastings's design for the Fifth Avenue Plaza thus called for subway entrances next to the plaza. Early plans called for the line to run under 59th Street west of the plaza, splitting into two tunnels under 59th and 60th streets to the east. The city set aside $50,000 to pay for the Pulitzer Fountain's construction, and work was about to begin by February 1914. Subway workers began excavating the Fifth Avenue–59th Street station under the plaza that October. The Sherman statue had to be temporarily relocated during the subway's construction, and the statue was relocated slightly north, inside Central Park, in November 1914. The Brooklyn Standard Union wrote of the relocation: "This is said to be the first time General Sherman ever retreated." Subway workers also erected a temporary structure in the northern half of the Fifth Avenue Plaza during the construction of the Fifth Avenue–59th Street station.

In 1915, the New York Public Service Commission approved a request to place both of the Broadway Line's subway tracks under 60th Street east of the plaza. This change necessitated that both tracks cross under the plaza. By November 1915. one newspaper reported that the fountain was finished. The Pulitzer Fountain's statue was unceremoniously installed around May 1, 1916. Originally, the fountain also had stone balustrades and torchères. The Fifth Avenue–59th Street station opened in 1919. After the subway was completed, the Sherman statue was moved back to the north half of the plaza in July 1919.

=== Mid- to late 20th century ===
==== 1920s and 1930s ====
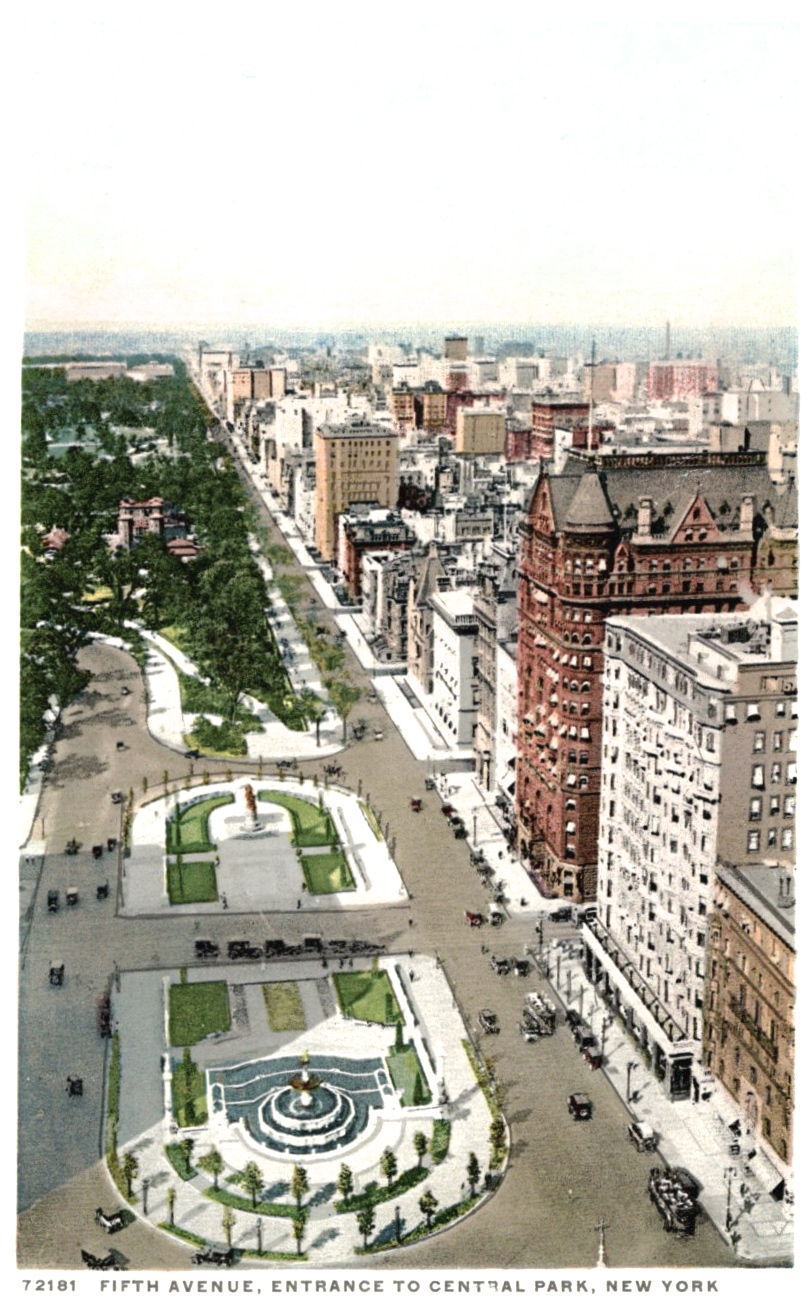
Drawing of Grand Army Plaza about 1920

There was an unsuccessful petition in 1921 to rename the plaza after former U.S. president Theodore Roosevelt. That year, the Fifth Avenue Association's Parks and Squares committee planted flowers around the plaza's Sherman statue. The New York City Board of Aldermen agreed to rename the space Grand Army Plaza in 1923, after the Grand Army of the Potomac. The plaza was formally renamed on April 10, 1924. On that date, a hundred veterans dedicated a plaque at the base of the Sherman statue, marking the 59th anniversary of the Battle of Appomattox Court House. Grand Army Plaza was seldom known by its official name; the square was often simply called "the Plaza", though this name was also used by the Plaza Hotel. Furthermore, the name "Grand Army Plaza" also referred to the former Prospect Park Plaza in Brooklyn, even though that plaza was renamed later.

The Sherman statue was regilded in 1928, following a donation from the Benevolent and Protective Order of Elks No. 1 of New York. The Pulitzer Fountain, which was made of soft Kentucky limestone, had deteriorated badly by then, and parts of the fountain's basin had chipped off. There were discussions about potentially removing the fountain altogether. The fountain's Victory sculpture was regilded in 1929. The Pulitzer family pledged to cover much of the fountain's restoration cost, initially offering $15,000 before increasing their offer to $25,000. The cost of renovation was estimated at between $30,000 and $40,000 by mid-1931, and the Municipal Art Commission approved D. Everett Waid's designs for the fountain's renovation that November. After the plans were revised, the commission approved the modified plan in February 1932. The Pulitzer family offered to contribute up to $35,000, but only on the condition that the city provide another $10,000. The city did not provide the funds, and the project was stalled until the family agreed to fund the entire $45,000 cost that November.

Restoration began in January 1933. The limestone basin was rebuilt in Italian marble, and the limestone balustrade and two columns surrounding the fountain were demolished. In addition, the fountain's sculpture was cleaned again. Work was delayed for several weeks in mid-1934 due to labor disputes involving the Stone Cutters' Association, which demanded that its employees be hired for the project; the restoration had resumed by August 1934. Further delays were caused by the need to replace one shipment of defective marble. The New York City Department of Parks and Recreation (NYC Parks) also proposed removing the balustrade around the Sherman Monument so the north plaza's design would match that of the south plaza. The work was ultimately completed by June 1935, and workers began adding granite sidewalks and rebuilding the stone walkways in the south plaza. The plaza hosted annual Memorial Day parades with Civil War veterans through the 1930s, although few veterans were still alive to attend the parade by the end of the decade.

==== 1940s to 1960s ====
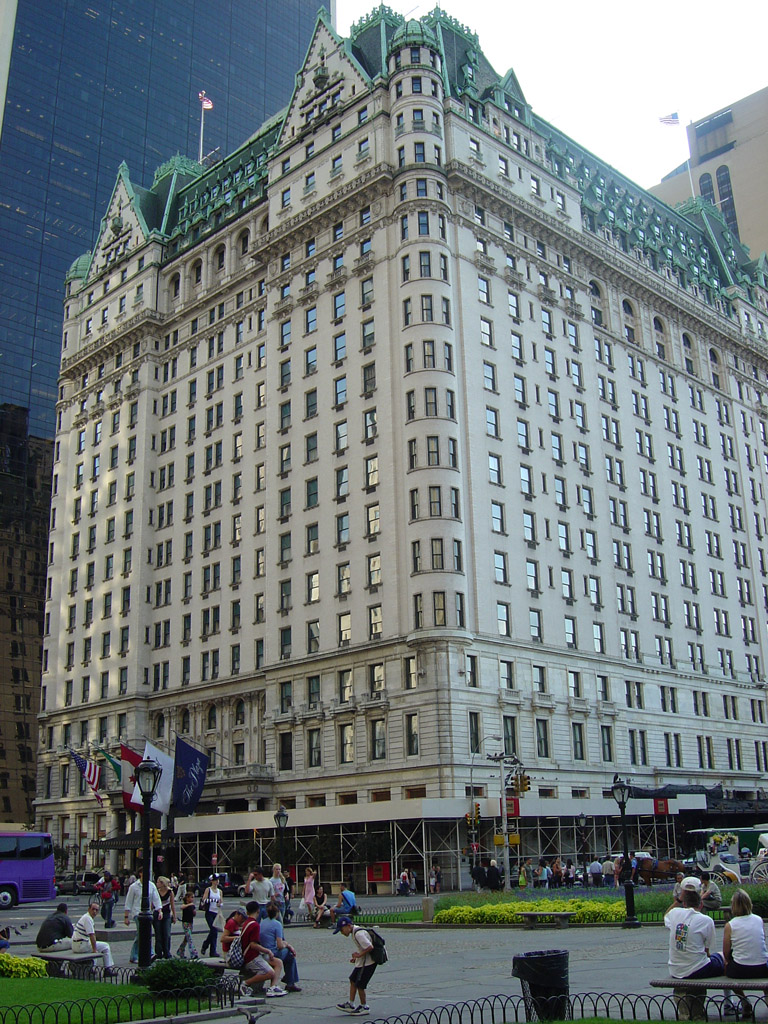
The Plaza Hotel, adjacent to the southern half of Grand Army Plaza, as seen from the northern half of the plaza

During World War II, an M4 Sherman tank was displayed alongside the plaza's Sherman statue, but NYC Parks commissioner Robert Moses forced the tank to be relocated to Columbus Circle after he objected to the tank, which was being used as an advertisement. After the end of the war, Dutch tulip growers and the family Albert Lasker donated 120,000 tulip bulbs to NYC Parks, which were planted at Grand Army Plaza and the median of Park Avenue in 1948. In addition, a major sewer line was installed under the plaza in the late 1940s, and the Pulitzer Fountain was renovated in 1948. Frank Mascali & Sons was also hired to remove the tracks of the 59th Street trolley line, which had run through the plaza, as part of a project to repave Central Park South. The tracks were removed starting in March 1950, and the project was completed by that June. The Pulitzer Fountain was turned off around that time because water from the fountain was seeping through cracks in the basement and onto the tracks of the Broadway subway tunnel.

In 1951, the American Society for the Prevention of Cruelty to Animals sponsored a portable water trough for Central Park carriage horses at Grand Army Plaza. The city began spending $28,910 on concrete basins for the fountain and $10,000 to illuminate the fountain at night in 1956, while hotel operators and merchants contributed another $7,400 to restore the fountain's Abundance statue. The following year, as part of a $309,500 project to beautify the city's streets, the city government announced plans to decorate Grand Army Plaza with flower boxes and install floodlights in the plaza; the lights were first turned on during October 1957. In an effort to illuminate the southeastern corner of Central Park, additional floodlights were installed in 1959 between the plaza and the Metropolitan Museum of Art's Fifth Avenue building.

The businessman Huntington Hartford donated funds in 1960 for the construction of a restaurant at the northwest corner of Central Park South and Grand Army Plaza. The proposed restaurant was the subject of several lawsuits over the next three years, and Mayor John V. Lindsay ultimately canceled plans for the restaurant. The adjacent segment of Fifth Avenue became a one-way southbound street in 1966, although merchants along and near Grand Army Plaza opposed the move. In addition, a model of a Japanese temple was displayed in the plaza in the late 1960s, and couples frequently met near Grand Army Plaza's fountain during that time. NYC Parks began planning the fountain's renovation as well. The area was a popular place for shoppers due to the presence of Bergdorf Goodman and FAO Schwarz. However, the plaza itself had become decrepit, and litter began to accumulate around the Pulitzer Fountain. Drunks frequented the fountain as well, and there were periodic demonstrations in the plaza, as well as rat infestations. The Sherman statue, meanwhile, had lost all of its gilding by 1968.

==== 1970s to 1990s ====
The Pulitzer Fountain was restored in 1971. As part of the $268,000 project, the fountain's drainage system was improved, the water basins were cleaned, and the cracked limestone steps at the fountain's base were replaced with granite. After the fountain was restored, office workers frequently congregated around it, although the plaza still suffered from rat infestations. The New York City Landmarks Preservation Commission (LPC) considered protecting Grand Army Plaza as a New York City scenic landmark in early 1974, and the plaza was designated accordingly on July 23, 1974. New York City Council president Paul O'Dwyer proposed renaming the plaza to "Common Sense Plaza" in honor of the author Thomas Paine in 1976. At the time, the name "Grand Army Plaza" more commonly referred to the plaza in Brooklyn. A Victorian-style information kiosk was installed at 60th Street, next to Central Park's entrance, later that decade.

In 1981, as part of a plan to restore the midtown section of Fifth Avenue, the Fifth Avenue Association proposed expanding the sidewalk on the northern end of the plaza. The ASPCA also operated a water-supply wagon and a spigot at Grand Army Plaza for Central Park's carriage horses. By the middle of the decade, the Pulitzer Fountain had again stopped working, and NYC Parks was looking for a private donor to fund the fountain's complete restoration. The Central Park Conservancy hired the architecture firm of Buttrick White & Burtis in 1985 to redesign the plaza. The plans called for the restoration of the balustrade and columns. The next year, Bergdorf Goodman hosted a party to raise money for the plaza's renovation. The Grand Army Plaza Partnership, led by The Estée Lauder Companies chief executive Leonard Lauder, ultimately raised $3.3 million for the restoration. The project's supporters requested donations from the owners of 15 buildings around the plaza; three of these property owners, Donald Trump, Corporate Property Investors, and Sheldon Solow, were among the project's largest donors. (Note: At the time, Trump owned the Plaza Hotel; CPI owned the General Motors Building; and Solow owned the Solow Building.) Workers cleaned the Pulitzer Fountain, replaced the pavers, and installed replicas of the original light fixtures, and they also rebuilt the fountain out of granite.

The fountain's reconstruction was completed in June 1990 at a cost of $3.7 million. The restoration work included a regilding of the Sherman Monument, for which the David Schwartz Foundation paid over $116,500. Locals regarded the restored statue as overly ostentatious and wasteful, while Richard J. Schwartz of the David Schwartz Foundation was dissatisfied with the gilding of the statue. The LPC also approved plans to restore the original balustrade, but due to the early 1990s recession, the full restoration never occurred. The advertising firm JCDecaux proposed installing a public toilet on Grand Army Plaza in 1991, as part of a pilot program to install public toilets in New York City, but the program was ultimately abandoned. The plaza's sidewalk was repaired in the 1990s, during a renovation of the Fifth Avenue–59th Street station, after the Metropolitan Transportation Authority found that there was no waterproofing under the plaza's sidewalk. In addition, a layer of wax was applied to the Sherman statue in 1996, dulling the intensity of the sculpture's gilding.

=== 21st century ===
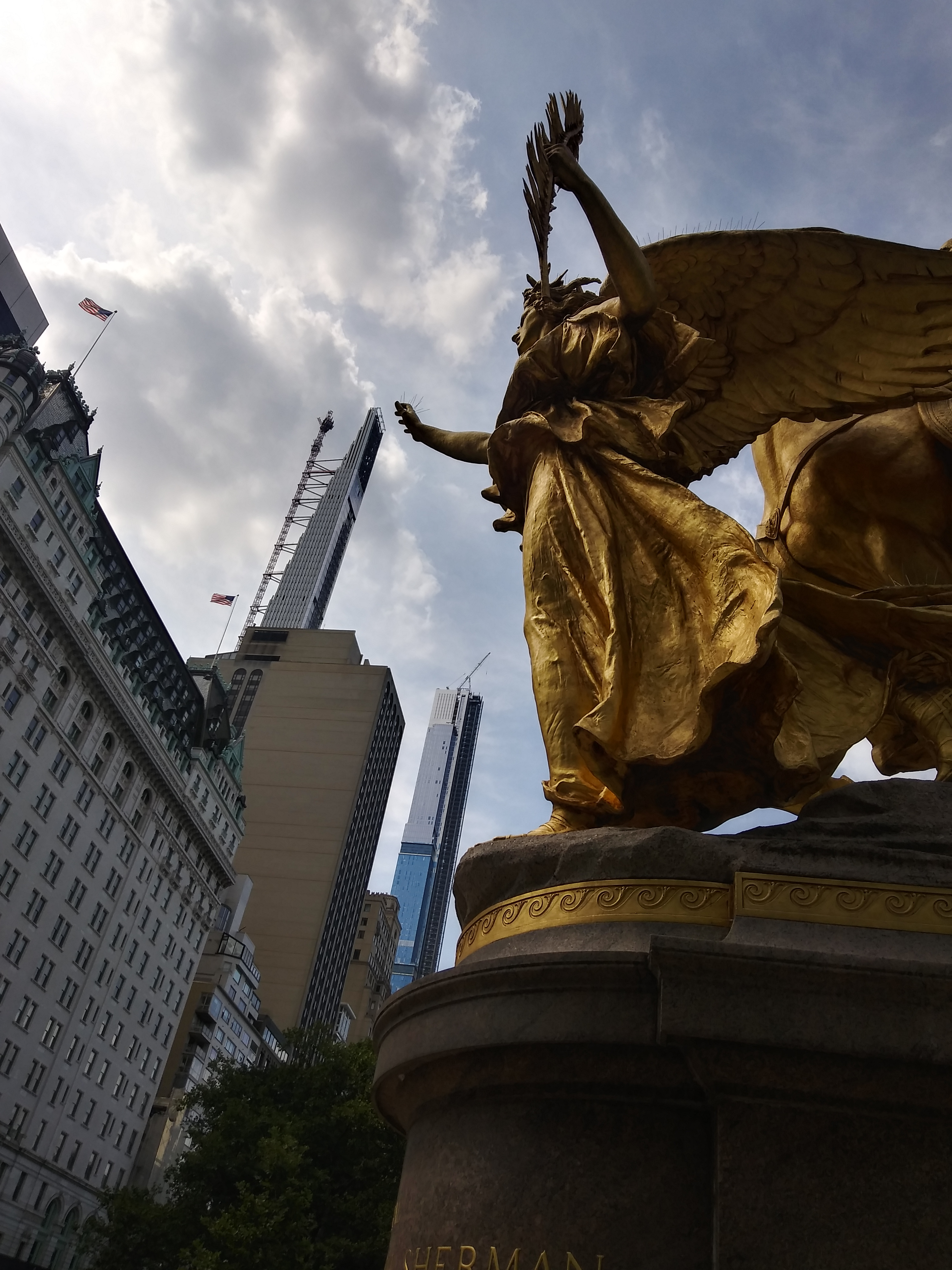
The goddess Nike on the Sherman Monument reaching toward Central Park South, August 2020

The plaza needed another renovation by the 2010s. In particular, a snowstorm in 2011 killed all of the trees in the northern half of the plaza, although the trees in the southern half remained standing. The Central Park Conservancy proposed spending $2 million on the northern half of the plaza in 2013. At the time, the group was planning to regild the Sherman statue, whose paint was beginning to chip. The organization said that it could not afford to restore the original balustrade because that would cost up to $4 million more. Preservationists opposed the original plans as being too narrow in scope; instead, the preservationists wanted the conservancy to also restore the original design details, such as benches and lights. The Sherman statue was regilded as part of the north-side renovation, and the original gilding was toned down. In addition, the area around the Sherman statue was repaved and regraded, and the drainage system was replaced. The north side of the plaza was reopened in 2015.

In 2018, New York City mayor Bill de Blasio proposed adding drop-off and pickup stands for Central Park's horse-drawn carriages at Grand Army Plaza, replacing an existing stand on Central Park South and 59th Street. Stands were added at two other locations, and carriages began using the new stands in 2019. Part of the plaza was rebuilt to make way for the horse-carriage stand, and cameras were installed around the plaza to prevent horse-carriage operators from picking up or dropping off passengers elsewhere. The New York City Department of Transportation (DOT) installed sidewalk extensions along Grand Army Plaza's roadway in late 2020 as part of a series of traffic changes along the southeast corner of Central Park. The section of Central Park South that bisected the plaza was converted to a one-way eastbound street. During the 2020s, operators of horse-drawn carriages advocated for the plaza to be closed to vehicular traffic entirely, providing a dedicated space for pedestrians and carriages.

The renovation of the south section of the plaza was delayed due to slow fundraising and the COVID-19 pandemic; this phase was financed mostly by private donations. The Central Park Conservancy began renovating the southern half of Grand Army Plaza in 2024. This project involved replacing the fountain, making the block more accessible, installing lighting, and adding utility equipment. A segment of the street adjacent to the plaza's southern section was also converted into a pedestrian plaza. The DOT and Central Park Conservancy proposed upgrading the lighting in both sections of the plaza in late 2025. The southern section's renovation was completed in June 2026 for $21 million.

== Reception and media ==
In 1899, the New-York Tribune wrote that the plaza "is one of the show-places of New York. It is a spot that lends itself to display of circumstance, pageantry and power." John Tauranac wrote retrospectively that the plaza was "a great social center by the early 1900s, but it was sorely lacking in grace". A Christian Science Monitor reporter wrote in 1959 that the plaza was "a goal in itself" with its fountain, horse-drawn carriages, and "cosmopolitan atmosphere". A writer for The New York Times said in 1962 that Grand Army Plaza "provides a serene contrast to the bustling midtown commerce" nearby and that it was one of a few remaining European-styled public spaces in the city. Another writer, in a 1965 Chicago Tribune article, said the area around the Sherman statue had "a feeling of spaciousness". Ada Louise Huxtable wrote in 1974 that the plaza was a "close-to-perfect city space" despite the presence of the General Motors Building, which she saw as the only intrusion onto the plaza. Huxtable thought Hastings's design helped conceptually connect the Sherman monument to the Pulitzer Fountain.

One guidebook from 1982 described Grand Army Plaza as "the zenith of [Fifth Avenue]'s pretensions". Following the plaza's 1990 renovation, New York Times architectural critic Paul Goldberger wrote that, although the fountain had been restored in a "superb" manner, the plaza functioned more like two disconnected spaces because of the presence of Central Park South. Christopher Gray wrote in 1999 that the plaza was "one of New York's few successful open spaces". Gray wrote that the plaza was mostly surrounded by similarly styled white-and-green buildings on all sides, with the exception of the plaza in front of the General Motors Building. In a subsequent article, Gray wrote that the plaza's southern half was the more important public space compared with the northern half, which blended inconspicuously into Central Park. A writer for the New York Daily News said in 2003 that "few places convey the city's charm better" than the plaza's fountain. The landscape preservationist Elizabeth Barlow Rogers wrote in 2018 that the plaza's Sherman statue was "a conspicuous legacy of the City Beautiful era".

The plaza's fountain has been shown in media such as the 1917 film Reaching for the Moon, the 1960 film From the Terrace, and the 1992 film Home Alone 2. The plaza itself has also been used as a filming location for media such as the 1959 film North by Northwest and the 1981 film Arthur.

== See also ==
- List of New York City Designated Landmarks in Manhattan from 14th to 59th Streets
- List of New York City Designated Landmarks in Manhattan from 59th to 110th Streets
- List of New York City scenic landmarks
- List of parks in New York City
