= David Freedberg =

American art historian

Director of Warburg Institute
- In office July 2015 – April 2017
- Preceded by: Peter Mack
- Succeeded by: Bill Sherman

Personal details
- Born: Cape Town, South Africa
- Education: Yale University (BA); University of Oxford (PhD)
- Occupation: Art historian Administrator

David Freedberg is Pierre Matisse Professor of the History of Art and Director of the Italian Academy for Advanced Studies in America at Columbia University. He was also Director of the Warburg Institute at the University of London from July 2015 to April 2017.

== Early years and career ==
Born in Cape Town, South Africa, David Freedberg was educated at the South African College High School in Newlands, Cape Town (1961–65), the University of Cape Town (1966), Yale University (B.A. 1969), and the University of Oxford (D.Phil. 1973).

Freedberg's first degree was in Classics, but he switched to art history while at Oxford as the result of the influence of E.H. Gombrich and Michael Baxandall with whom he studied at the Warburg Institute in London.

He taught at the Courtauld Institute of Art of the University of London before being appointed Professor of the History of Art at Columbia in 1984. He has also been Slade Professor of Fine Art at Oxford in 1983–1984 and at Cambridge in 2016–2017, Andrew W. Mellon Professor at the National Gallery of Art (1996–1998), Nat C. Robertson Professor of Science and Society at Emory University (2006), Rudolf Wittkower Professor at the Biblioteca Hertziana in Rome (2008–2009), etc. He is a Fellow of the American Academy of Arts and Sciences, the American Philosophical Society, the Accademia Nazionale di Agricultura in Bologna, and the Istituto Veneto per le Scienze, Lettere e Arti.

A volume of Tributes to David A. Freedberg: Image and Insight was published in 2019, edited by Claudia Swan.

== Research ==
David Freedberg is best known for his work on psychological responses to art, and particularly for his studies on iconoclasm and censorship. He first investigated this topic in the early 1970s in preparation for his dissertation Iconoclasm and Painting in the Revolt of the Netherlands (University of Oxford 1973) and in Iconoclasts and Their Motives, 1984, which was followed by the landmark book, The Power of Images: Studies in the History and Theory of Response, published by the University of Chicago Press in 1989 and in several subsequent editions in many languages.

Freedberg's more traditional art historical writing originally centered on the fields of Dutch and Flemish art. Within these fields he specialized in the history of Dutch printmaking (Dutch Landscape Prints of the Seventeenth Century, 1980), and in the paintings and drawings of Bruegel and Rubens (The Prints of Pieter Bruegel the Elder, 1989, and Rubens: The Life of Christ after the Passion, 1984).

Freedberg then turned his attention to seventeenth-century Roman art and to the paintings of Nicolas Poussin. Following a series of important discoveries in Windsor Castle, the Institut de France and the archives of the Accademia dei Lincei in Rome of drawings made under the auspices of Galileo's closest friends and collaborators, he began working on the intersection of art and science in the circle of the first modern scientific academy, the Accademia dei Lincei. While much of his work in this area has been published in articles and catalogues, his chief publication in this field is The Eye of the Lynx: Galileo, His Friends, and the Beginnings of Modern Natural History (2002).

During the late 1980s and 1990s Freedberg was involved in several exhibitions of contemporary art, and coauthored The Play of the Unmentionable (1992) with Joseph Kosuth. It was at this time that he also began working on the subject of dance, and in particular on his long-term project on the dance and architecture of the Pueblo peoples.

From the mid-1980s on, Freedberg began speaking and writing about the importance of the new cognitive neurosciences for the understanding of responses to art and images. He is now devoting a substantial portion of his attention to collaborations with neuroscientists working in fields of movement, embodiment, and emotion.

A distinctive aspect of Freedberg's work has been his many collaborative projects and publications, not only with other art historians and conservation scientists, but also botanists, paleontologists, mycologists and above all neuroscientists.

== Humanities and Neuroscience ==
Much of Freedberg's time is now taken up by his directorship of the Italian Academy for Advanced Studies in America and his commitment to fostering interdisciplinary work across the humanities and the sciences. At the academy he established its pioneering Humanities and Neurosciences Project in 2001. The initial aim was to bring humanists and neuroscientists together to assess the possibilities for the humanities and social sciences of new understandings of the neural substrate of responses to art and to images. This was followed by a series of bi-annual conferences on neuroscientific issues of topical interest (for example those on Vision, Attention, and Emotion in 2008, Neurotechniques in 2010, Music and Neuroscience in 2011, and the Default Mode Network in 2014).

Throughout Freedberg has sought to achieve a balanced assessment of new understandings of the neural substrate of responses to humans and their representations. In encouraging such work, he has set out to minimize skepticism and allay fears that the practices and procedures of contemporary neurobiological investigations threaten the contextual approaches of the humanities and social sciences. The overall aim of the programs at the Italian Academy has been to foster the mutual understanding of new techniques and leading paradigms in the sciences and the humanities, and to achieve new epistemological frameworks for the disciplines.

In 2007, together with neuroscientist Vittorio Gallese, he has published an article entitles Motion, Emotion and Empathy in Esthetic Experience which become so polemical in the field. As Freedberg and Gallese explain, as the eye sees a work of art, the brain mimics gestures mentally, before it cognitively recognizes the conceptual context or effect of the action it's mimicking. Freedberg and Gallese's theory of aesthetic empathetic responses therefore introduces a possible scientific ally into the aesthetic position of nonconceptual or noncognitive formalism.

== The Warburg Institute ==
From 2015 to 2017, Freedberg was Director of the Warburg Institute at the University of London. His aim while at the institute was to revive the promise of the work of Aby Warburg and his approaches to the history of art, images, and culture more broadly: emphasizing the psychological, anthropological, political, and biological aspects of Warburg's work. He sought to inject new energy into the main intellectual directions of the institute, which, under threat from Nazism, was transferred from Hamburg to London in 1933.

== Cultural Heritage and the Indigenous Communities of North America ==
Freedberg's concerns with historic preservation both in the US and across the globe also resulted in the creation (by him and Barbara Faedda) of the International Observatory for Cultural Heritage at the Italian Academy, which has so far concentrated on Italian, Middle Eastern and Native American issues and has sought to engage native peoples from affected regions as far as possible. The mission of the IOCH “recognizes the need to conserve all that is meaningful in culture at a time when so much is threatened with the imminent possibility of destruction.” In March 2018 Freedberg and his colleagues organized the symposium ‘Threatened heritage: Bears Ears, Chaco and Beyond,' which explored the cultural, political and spiritual implications of the Trump administration's decision in December 2017 to reduce the size of Bears Ears National Monument by 85%.

Freedberg is also president of The Friends of Liberty Hall, a non-profit organization dedicated to the restoration of Liberty Hall in Machiasport, Maine, which overlooks the site of the first sea battle of the American Revolution.

== Selected publications ==
- Dutch Landscape Prints of the Seventeenth Century. London: British Museum Publications, 1980.
- Rubens: The Life of Christ after the Passion. London, New York: Harvey Miller/Oxford University Press, 1984.
- Iconoclasts and Their Motives. Maarssen: Gary Schwartz, 1985.
- The Power of Images: Studies in the History and Theory of Response. University of Chicago Press, 1989.
- Art History, History in Art: Studies in Seventeenth-Century Dutch Culture. Getty Center for Education in the Arts, 1992.
- Joseph Kosuth: The Play of the Unmentionable. New York: The New Press, 1992.
- Citrus Fruit: The Paper Museum of Cassiano dal Pozzo, Natural History Series, I. London: Harvey Miller Publishers, 1997. (With Enrico Baldini.)
- Fossil Woods and Other Geological Specimens: The Paper Museum of Cassiano dal Pozzo, Natural History Series, III. London: Harvey Miller Publishers, 2000. (With Andrew Scott.)
- Fungi: The Paper Museum of Cassiano dal Pozzo, Natural History Series, II. 3 vols. London: The Royal Collection in association with Harvey Miller, 2005. (With David Pegler.)
- The Eye of the Lynx: Galileo, His Friends, and the Beginnings of Modern Natural History. Chicago: The University of Chicago Press, 2002.
- Las Mascaras de Aby Warburg, with an introduction by Luis Vives-Ferrándiz Sanchez and translated by Marta Piñol Lloret, Vitoria-Gasteiz / Buenos Aires: Sans Soleil Ediciones, 2013.
- Iconoclasia. Historia y psicología de la violencia contras las imágenes, edited and translated by Marina Gutiérrez De Angelis, Vitoria-Gasteiz / Buenos Aires: Sans Soleil Ediciones, 2017.

Freedberg also serves on the boards of several academic and professional journals, including Print Quarterly (London), Res (New York), Revue de l'Art, Nuncius (Florence), the Journal of Neuroesthetics (London), Arts and Neurosciences (Paris), Imagines (Rome), etc.
