= Peter Mack =

Peter Mack may refer to:

- Peter F. Mack Jr. (1916–1986), U.S. Representative from Illinois
- Peter Mack (academic) (1955–2023), British academic
