= Thorkild Jacobsen =

Danish Assyriologist and archaeologist

- Born: 7 June 1904; Copenhagen, Denmark
- Died: 2 May 1993 (aged 88); Bradford, New Hampshire, U.S.
- Education: University of Copenhagen (MA); University of Chicago (PhD)
- Known for: The Treasures of Darkness Sumerian King List
- Awards: Guggenheim Fellowship
- Scientific career
- Fields: Assyriology
- Workplaces: University of Chicago; Harvard University

Thorkild Peter Rudolph Jacobsen (Danish: [ˈtsʰɒːkʰil ˈjɑkʌpsn̩]; 7 June 1904 – 2 May 1993) was a Danish historian specializing in Assyriology and Sumerian literature. He was one of the foremost scholars on the ancient Near East.

== Biography ==
Thorkild Peter Rudolph Jacobsen received, in 1927, an M.A. from the University of Copenhagen and then came to the United States to study at the Oriental Institute of the University of Chicago, where, in 1929, he received his Ph.D.

He was a field Assyriologist for the Iraq Expedition of the Oriental Institute from 1929 to 1937) and in 1946 became director of the Oriental Institute. He served as Dean of the Humanities Division from 1948 to 1951, as an editor of the Assyrian Dictionary from 1955 to 1959, and as Professor of Social Institutions from 1946–1962.

In 1962, Jacobsen became a professor of Assyriology at Harvard University, where he remained until his retirement in 1974. He was a skilled translator and interpreter whose work led to a deeper academic understanding and appreciation of the institutions and normative references of Sumerian and Akkadian culture.

Jacobsen retired as a professor of Assyriology at Harvard University in 1974. In 1974 he served as a visiting professor at UCLA where he helped develop a strong Assyriology program. Jacobsen served in 1993 as president of the American Oriental Society, an organization of scholars. He was also an elected member of the American Philosophical Society and the American Academy of Arts and Sciences. He was 88 years of age when he died in Bradford, New Hampshire.

== Selected works ==
- Sumerian King List (1939)
- The Temple Oval at Khafajah - chapter by Thorkild Jacobsen (1940)
- The Intellectual Adventure of Ancient Man: An Essay of Speculative Thought in the Ancient Near East (1946; 1977) with Henri & Henriette Frankfort, John Wilson, William Irwin
- Towards the Image of Tammuz and Other Essays on Mesopotamian History and Culture - edited by William L. Moran (1970)
- The Treasures of Darkness: A History of Mesopotamian Religion (1976)
- The Harps that Once... Sumerian Poetry in Translation (1987)

== Partial list of excavations ==
- Eshnunna
- Khafajah
- Tell Agrab
- Tell Ishchali
- Lagash

== Awards ==
- Jacobsen was awarded a Guggenheim Fellowship in Near Eastern Studies in 1968.

== Sources ==
- In Memoriam by J. A. Brinkman. The Oriental Institute
