= Gertrud Bing =

German art historian (1892–1964)

- Born: 7 June 1892; Hamburg, German Empire
- Died: 3 July 1964 (aged 72); University College Hospital, London, United Kingdom
- Occupations: Art historian; director

Academic background
- Education: Ludwig-Maximilians-Universität München
- Alma mater: University of Hamburg
- Thesis: Der Begriff des Notwendigen bei Lessing : ein Beitrag zum geistesgeschichtlichen Problem (1921)
- Doctoral advisor: Ernst Cassirer

Academic work
- Discipline: Art historian
- Institutions: Kulturwissenschaftlichen Bibliothek Warburg (1922–1933); Warburg Institute (1933–1959)

Gertrud Bing (7 June 1892 – 3 July 1964) was a German art historian and director of the Warburg Institute.

== Early life and education ==
Gertrud Bing was born in Hamburg on 7 June 1892, to Moritz Bing, a merchant, and Emma Jonas. Bing originally trained as a school teacher, and taught for eighteen months during the early 1910s.

In 1916, Bing enrolled at the Ludwig-Maximilians-Universität München and studied philosophy, German literature, and psychology. Bing returned to teaching in 1918, before resuming her studies at the University of Hamburg in 1919. Bing gained her PhD in 1921. Supervised by Ernst Cassirer, Bing's doctoral dissertation focused on the works of Gotthold Ephraim Lessing and Gottfried Wilhelm Leibniz.

== Career ==
=== Kulturwissenschaftlichen Bibliothek Warburg ===
In 1922, Bing began working as a librarian at the ″Kulturwissenschaftlichen Bibliothek Warburg″, founded by Aby Warburg.

=== Warburg Institute ===
In December 1933, the ″Kulturwissenschaftlichen Bibliothek Warburg″ was moved to London when the Nazis rose to power, becoming the Warburg Institute. With her partner, Fritz Saxl, the new institute's first director, she settled in Dulwich. Saxl died in 1948, and was succeeded as director by Henri Frankfort.

After the death of Frankfort in 1954, Bing in 1955 became director of the institute and Professor of the History of the Classical Tradition. She held these posts until her retirement in 1959. Gertrud Bing died in 1964 in London, following a brief illness.

== Writings ==
- Fragments sur Aby Warburg. Documents originaux et leur traduction française. Avant-propos de Carlo Ginzburg. Edited by Philippe Despoix and Martin Treml. Paris 2019.
