= Mythopoeic =

Mythopoeic ("of or pertaining to myth-making", noun mythopoeia; also mythopoetic, noun mythopoesis) may refer to:

- Mythopoeia, a subgenre of speculative fiction where an artificial or fictionalized mythology is created by a writer of prose, poetry, or other literary forms
- Mythopoeic thought, a hypothetical stage of human thought preceding modern thought
- Mythopoeic Society, a non-profit organization devoted to the study of mythopoeic literature
  - Mythopoeic Awards, given annually for outstanding works in the fields of myth, fantasy, and the scholarly study of these areas
- Mythopoetic men's movement, a body of self-help activities and therapeutic workshops and retreats for men undertaken by various organizations and authors in the United States from the early 1980s through the 1990s
