= Mythopoeic thought =

Hypothetical stage of human thought

Mythopoeic thought is a hypothetical stage of human thought preceding modern thought in which humanity did not think in terms of generalizations and impersonal laws: instead, humans saw each event as an act of will on the part of some personal being. It was proposed by Henri Frankfort and his wife Henriette Antonia Frankfort in the 1940s, based on their interpretation of evidence from archaeology and cultural anthropology. Mythopoeic thought supposedly explains the ancients' tendency to create myths, which portray events as acts of gods and spirits. A physiological motivation for this was suggested by Julian Jaynes in 1976 in the form of bicameral mentality.

== Etymology ==
The term mythopoeic means "myth-making" (from Greek muthos, "myth", and poiein, "to make"). A group of Near Eastern specialists used the term in their 1946 book The Intellectual Adventure of Ancient Man: An Essay on Speculative Thought in the Ancient Near East, later republished as the 1949 paperback Before Philosophy: The Intellectual Adventure of Ancient Man. In this book's introduction, two of the specialists, Henri Frankfort and Henriette Groenewegen-Frankfort, argue that mythopoeic thought characterizes a distinct stage of human thought that differs fundamentally from modern, scientific thought. Mythopoeic thought, the Frankforts claim, was concrete and personifying, whereas modern thought is abstract and impersonal: more basically, mythopoeic thought is "pre-philosophical", while modern thought is "philosophical". Because of this basic contrast between mythopoeic and modern thought, the Frankforts often use the term "mythopoeic thought" as a synonym for ancient thought in general.

== Characteristics ==
=== Personalistic view of nature ===
According to the Frankforts, "the fundamental difference between the attitudes of modern and ancient man as regards the surrounding world is this: for modern, scientific man the phenomenal world is primarily an 'It'; for ancient—and also for primitive—man it is a 'Thou'". In other words, modern man sees most things as impersonal objects, whereas ancient man sees most things as beings.

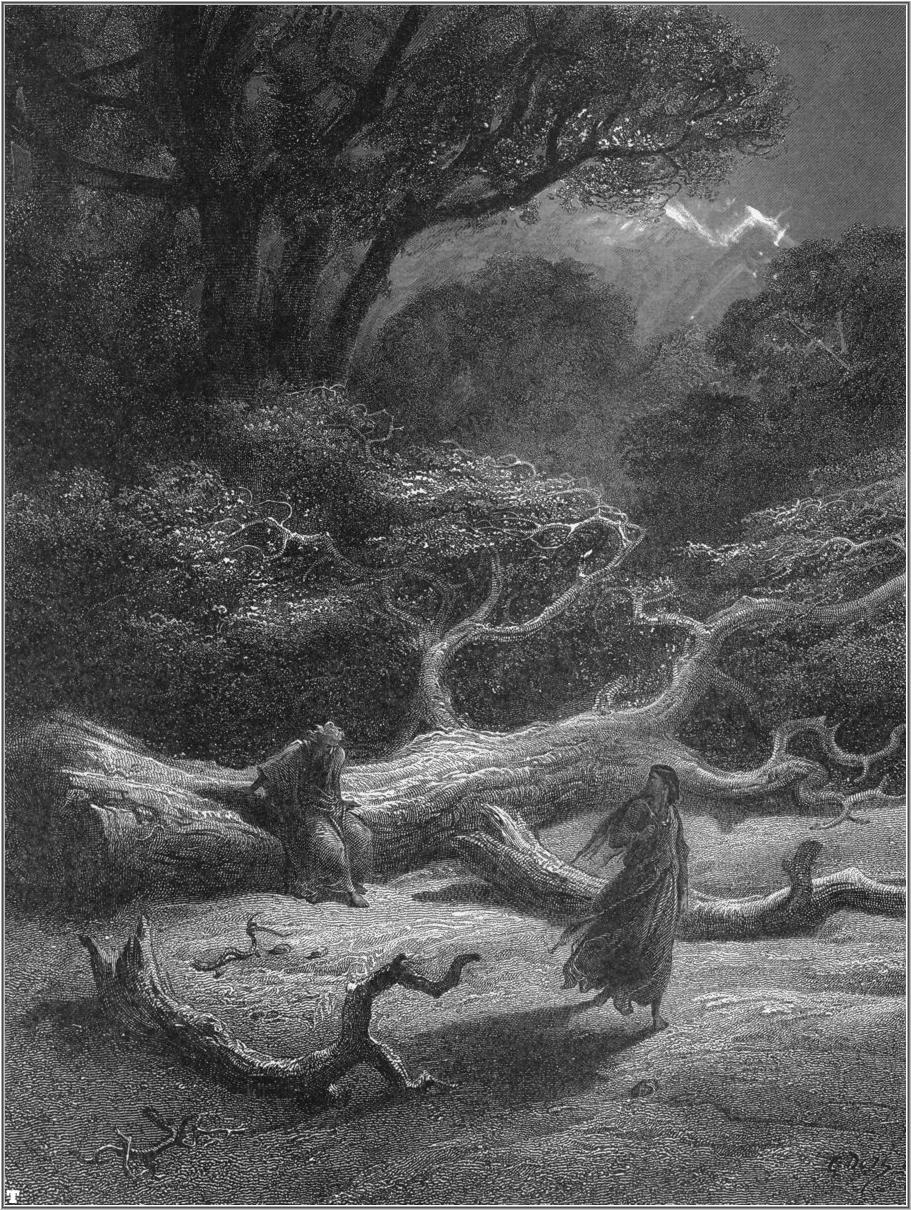
Merlin and Vivien in the enchanted forest of Brocéliande, illustrated by Gustave Doré for Tennyson's Idylls of the King

According to the Frankforts, ancients viewed the world this way because they didn't think in terms of universal laws. Modern thought "reduces the chaos of perceptions to an order in which typical events take place according to universal laws." For example, consider a river that usually rises in the spring. Suppose that, one spring, the river fails to rise. In that case, modern thought doesn't conclude that the laws of nature have changed; instead, it searches for a set of fixed, universal laws that can explain how the river has risen in other cases but not in this case. Modern thought is abstract: it looks for unifying principles behind diversity.

In contrast, the Frankforts argue, "the primitive mind cannot withdraw to that extent from perceptual reality". Mythopoeic thought doesn't look for unifying principles behind the diversity of individual events. It is concrete, not abstract: it takes each individual event at face value. When a river rises one year and fails to rise another year, mythopoeic thought doesn't try to unite those two different events under a common law. Instead, "when the river does not rise, it has refused to rise". And if no law governs the river's behavior, if the river has simply "refused" to rise, then its failure to rise must be a choice: "The river, or the gods, must be angry", and must be choosing to withhold the annual flooding. Thus, mythopoeic thought ends up viewing the entire world as personal: each event is an act of will.

=== Tolerance of contradiction ===
The Frankforts argue that mythopoeic thought explains the tolerance of seeming contradictions in mythology. According to the Frankforts' theory, the ancients didn't try to unite different experiences under a universal law; instead, they took each individual experience at face value. Therefore, they sometimes took one experience and developed a myth from it, and took a different experience and developed a different myth from it, without worrying whether those two myths contradicted each other: "The ancients ... are likely to present various descriptions of natural phenomena side by side even though they are mutually exclusive." The Frankforts offer as an example that the ancient Egyptians had three different creation myths.

== The loss of mythopoeic thought ==
According to the Frankforts, "ancient Egyptians and Mesopotamians"—the Frankforts' area of expertise—"lived in a wholly mythopoeic world". Each natural force, each concept, was a personal being from their viewpoint: "In Egypt and Mesopotamia the divine was comprehended as immanent: the gods were in nature." This immanence and multiplicity of the divine is a direct result of mythopoeic thought: hence, the first step in the loss of mythopoeic thought was the loss of this view of the divine. The ancient Hebrews took this first step through their doctrine of a single, transcendent God:

"When we read in Psalm 19 that 'the heavens declare the glory of God; and the firmament sheweth his handiwork,' we hear a voice which mocks the beliefs of the Egyptians and Babylonians. The heavens, which were to the psalmist but a witness of God's greatness, were to the Mesopotamians the very majesty of godhead, the highest ruler, Anu. [...] The God of the psalmists and the prophets was not in nature. He transcended nature — and transcended, likewise, the realm of mythopoeic thought."

The ancient Hebrews still saw each major event as a divine act. However, they saw the divine as a single being—not a myriad of spirits, one for each natural phenomenon. Moreover, they didn't see the divine as a will within nature: for them, the divine will was a force or law behind all natural events.

Some Greek philosophers went further. Instead of seeing each event as an act of will, they developed a notion of impersonal, universal law: they finally abandoned mythopoeic thought, postulating impersonal laws behind all natural phenomena. These philosophers may not have been scientific by today's rigid standards: their hypotheses were often based on assumptions, not empirical data. However, by the mere fact that they looked behind the apparent diversity and individuality of events in search of underlying laws, and defied "the prescriptive sanctities of religion", the Greeks broke away from mythopoeic thought.

== Criticism ==
Religious scholar Robert Segal has pointed out that the dichotomy between a personal and an impersonal view of the world is not absolute, as the Frankforts' distinction between ancient and modern thought might suggest: "Any phenomenon can surely be experienced as both an It and a Thou: consider, for example, a pet and a patient." Furthermore, Segal argues, it is "embarrassingly simplistic" to call the ancient Near East "wholly mythopoeic", the Hebrews "largely nonmythopoeic", and the Greeks "wholly scientific".

== See also ==
- Behavioral modernity
- Bicameral mentality
- Cognitive dissonance
- Magical thinking
- Panpsychism
- Psychohistory
- Psychology of religion

== Sources and bibliography ==
- Henri Frankfort, et al. The Intellectual Adventure of Ancient Man: An Essay on Speculative Thought in the Ancient Near East. Chicago: University of Chicago Press, 1977. ISBN 9780226260082
- Segal, Robert A. Myth: A Very Short Introduction. Oxford: Oxford UP, 2004. ISBN 9780192803474
