= Buttrick White & Burtis =

American architecture firm

Buttrick White & Burtis Architects (also known as BWB Architects) was an architecture firm based in New York City, established in 1981 by the architects Harold Buttrick, Samuel G. White, and Theodore A. Burtis III. The firm remained active until 2002. Harold Buttrick left BWB in 1998 to form Murphy Burnham & Buttrick (MBB Architects). The architect Jean P. Phifer was a partner of the firm from 1989 until 1996, after which she served as president of the New York City Public Design Commission from 1998 to 2003. The architect Michael Dwyer was associated with the firm from 1981 to 1996. The architect and educator William W. Braham was associated with the firm from 1983 to 1989. In 2002, Buttrick White & Burtis merged with Platt Byard Dovell to become Platt Byard Dovell White (PBDW Architects).

== Architecture practice ==
Buttrick White & Burtis's work was eclectic. Writing in 1985 in New York Magazine, the architectural historian Carter Wiseman contrasted the firm's conservative renovation work at the traditional, oak-paneled Harvard Club of New York with their more avant-garde designs for the stores of the then-hip Tower Records chain, adding that the chain's downtown venue was "the most successful such enterprise in America."

=== Historic preservation ===
BWB was also known for artful renovations and additions to architectural landmarks such as Casa Italiana, Columbia University, completed in 1996; and the Brooklyn College library, completed in 2002.

=== Saint Thomas Choir School ===
The firm's largest project, a fifteen-story, postmodern building in Manhattan, built for the Saint Thomas Choir School, was begun in 1985, completed in 1987, and dedicated on January 14, 1988 by the Most Rev. and Rt. Hon. Robert Runcie, Archbishop of Canterbury. In 1990, Paul Goldberger, architecture critic for The New York Times, included the school "among the city's best examples of contextual architecture."

=== Traditional work ===
BWB occasionally designed new work in a traditional idiom; in a 1995 survey by The New York Times of the then-emerging New Classical school of architecture, the reporter Patricia Leigh Brown noted that, "Michael Dwyer...an architect at Buttrick White & Burtis...has recently completed a classical-style yacht and an $8.95 million town house on the Upper East Side and is renovating Rudolph Nureyev's former apartment in the Dakota."

=== Work in Central Park ===
For a decade, beginning in 1984, BWB designed the architectural components of the Central Park Conservancy's master plan for the rehabilitation of the long neglected park. The largest of these projects, the restoration of the Grand Army Plaza at the park's southeast corner, well-funded by the surrounding property owners, was completed in 1990. In addition to its numerous restoration projects, BWB added two new buildings to the park: Ballplayers House, in 1990, and the Dana Discovery Center, in 1993. Two others: a new tennis house and a new restaurant on Harlem Meer were proposed but not built.

== Principal architectural works ==
- Ships Chandlery, 170 John St., New York City (restoration & addition of sixth floor, completed 1982).
- Tower Records, Broadway at 4th St., New York City (completed 1983).
- Tower Records, Broadway at West 66th St., New York City (completed 1984).
- Tower Records, Washington DC (completed 1985).
- Tower Records, Torrance, CA (completed 1986).
- Tower Records, Piccadilly Circus, London, UK (completed 1986).
- Saint Thomas Choir School, 202 West 58th St., New York City (completed 1987).
- Grand Army Plaza, Manhattan, New York City (restoration completed 1990).
- Ballplayers House, Central Park, New York City (completed 1990).
- Annex Building, Chapin School, New York City (completed 1990).
- Classical Townhouse, 14 East 81st St., New York City (completed 1991).
- Dana Discovery Center, Central Park, New York City (completed 1993).
- William Sidney Mount House, Stony Brook, NY (restored 1993).
- Edison Arms Apartments, 2828 Decatur Ave., Bronx, New York (completed 1993).
- Bonnie Dune, Residence, Southampton, NY (restored 1993—with interior decoration by Jed Johnson Associates).
- Otto H. Kahn House (Convent of the Sacred Heart), Fifth Avenue at 91st St., New York City (restored 1994).
- Casa Italiana, Columbia University, New York City (restoration & new east facade, completed 1996—with Italo Rota, associate architect).
- Frick Art Research Library of the Frick Collection, 1 East 70th Street), Fifth Avenue, New York City (alterations completed 1996—with Shepley Bulfinch, associate architect).
- Walsh Library, Fordham University, Bronx, NY (completed 1996—with Shepley Bulfinch, associate architect).
- Siegel Student Center, Sarah Lawrence College, Bronxville, NY (restoration & addition, completed 1998).
- Middle School Building, Trinity School, New York City (completed 1998).
- Second Street Child Care Center, 333 Second St., Brooklyn, New York (completed 1999).
- Marymount School of New York, 2 East 82nd St., New York City (alterations completed 2001).
- Library, Brooklyn College, Brooklyn, NY (restoration & addition, completed 2002—with Shepley Bulfinch, associate architect).

== Gallery ==
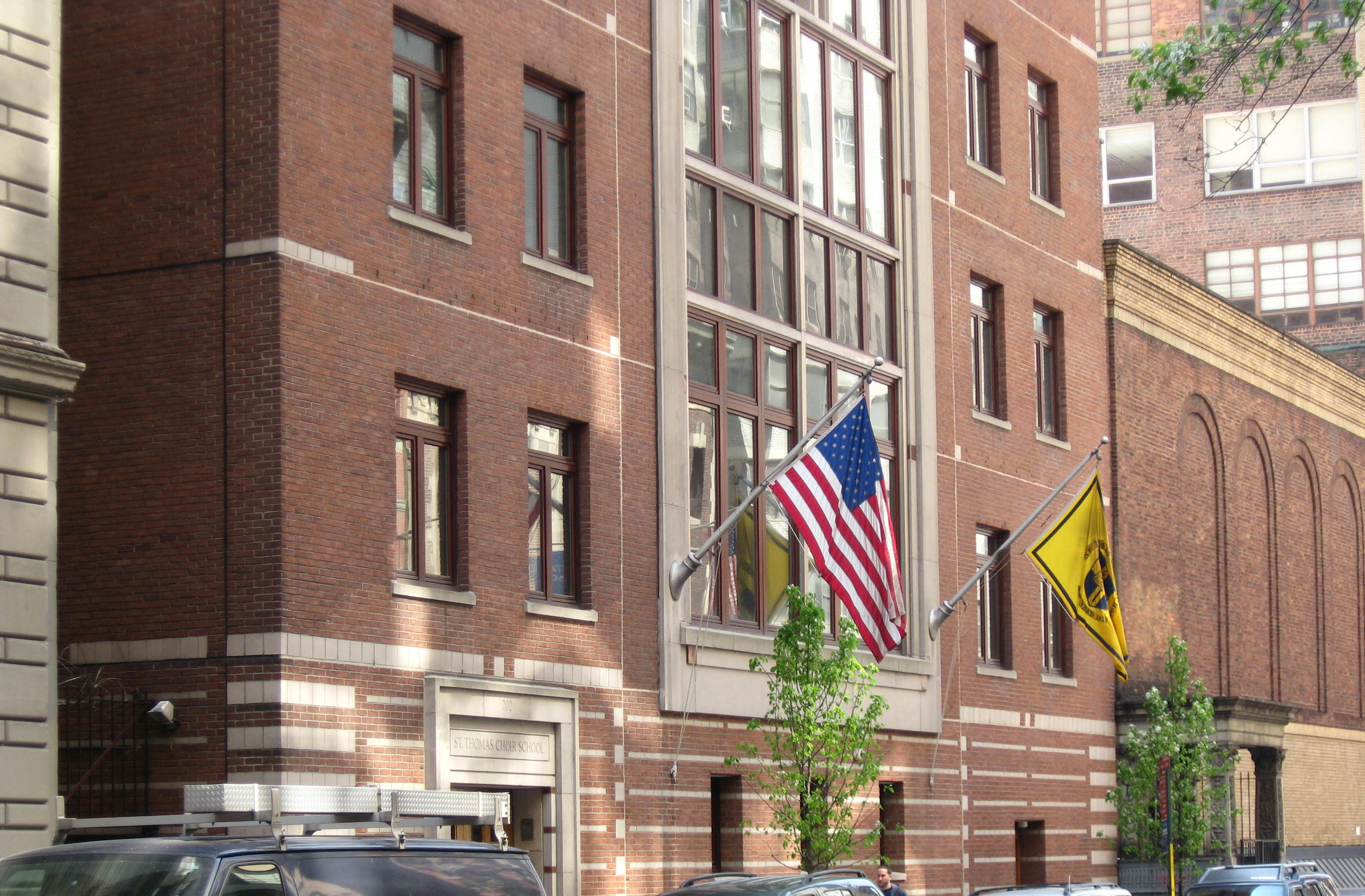
Detail, Saint Thomas Choir School, New York City, completed in 1987.

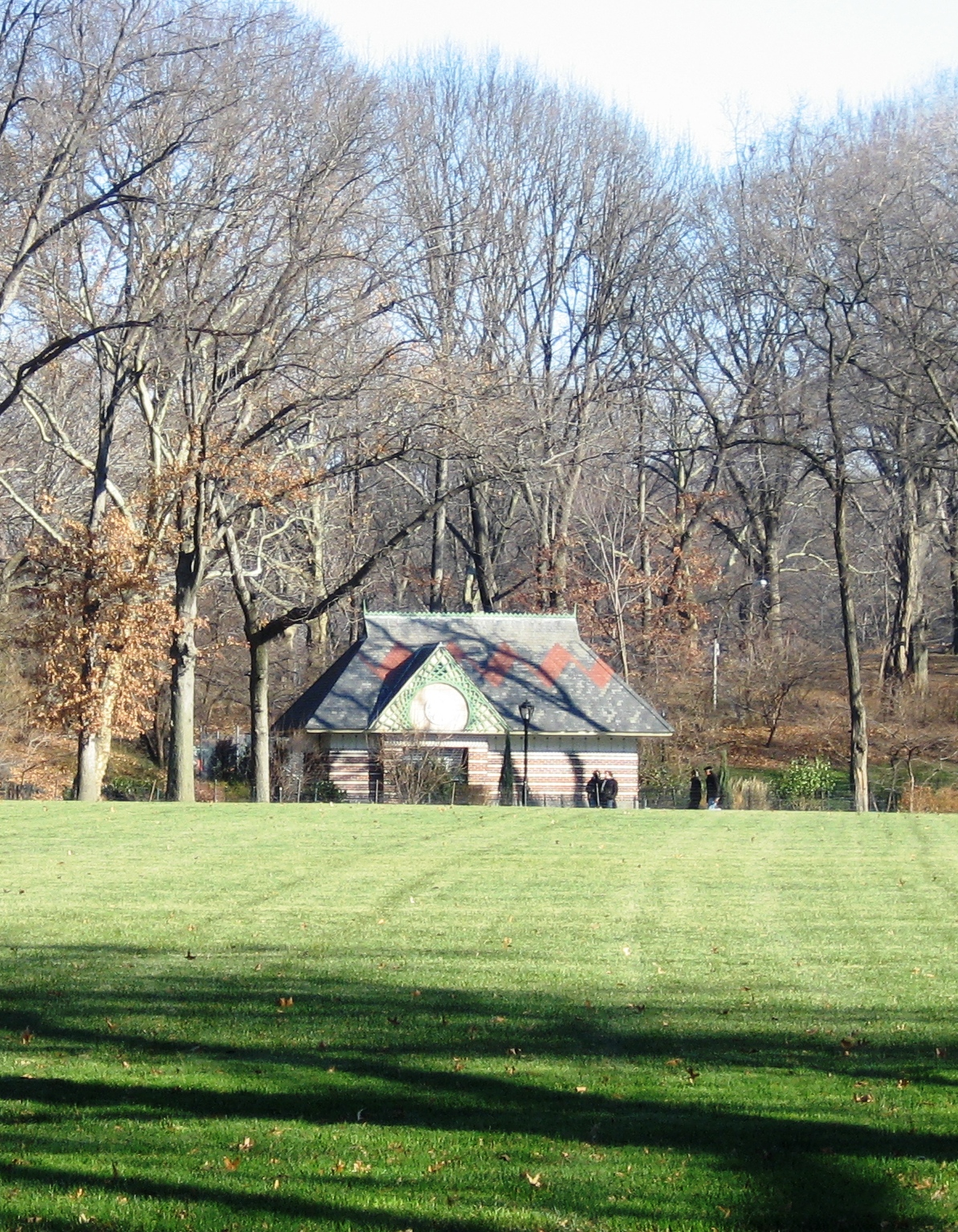
Ballplayers House, Central Park, New York City, completed in 1990.

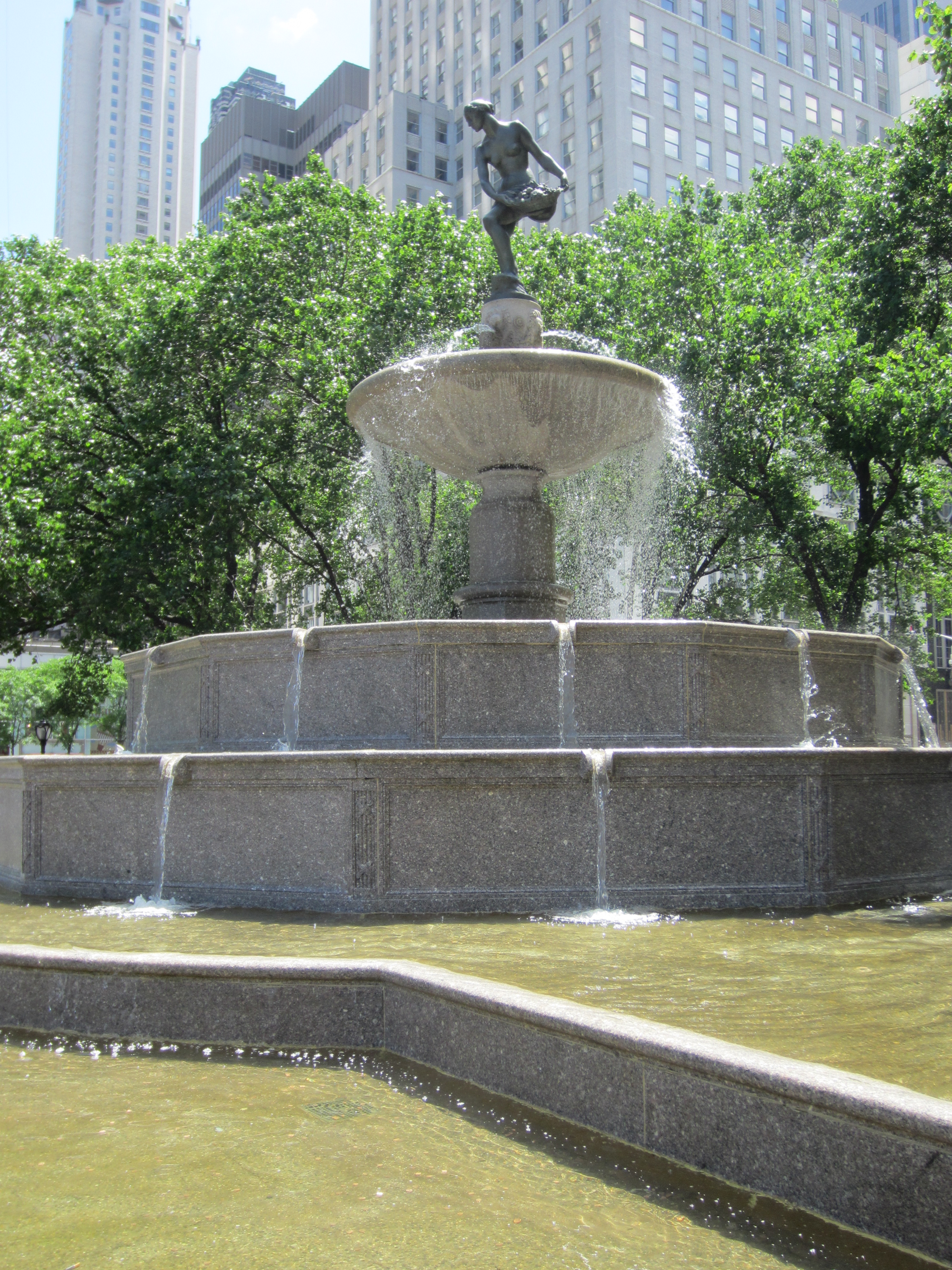
Grand Army Plaza (Manhattan) & Pulitzer Fountain, New York City, restored in 1990.

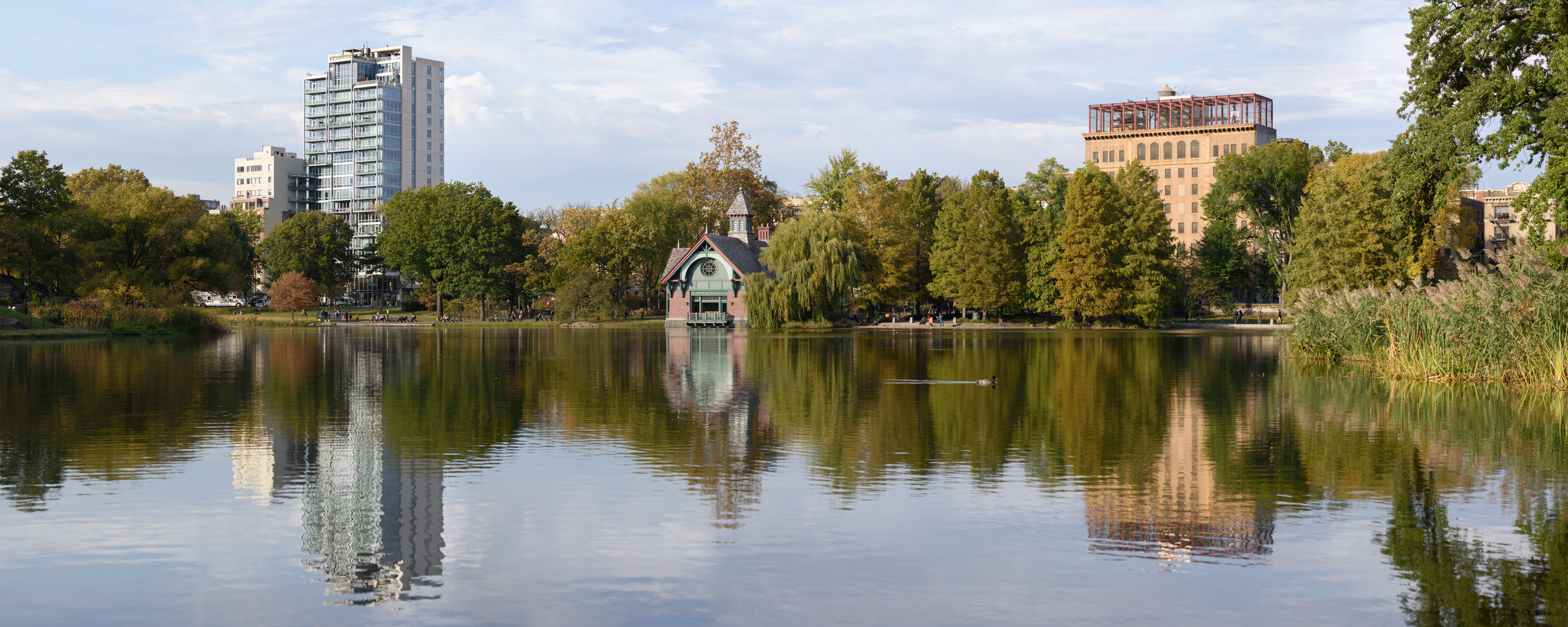
Dana Discovery Center, Central Park, New York City, completed in 1993.

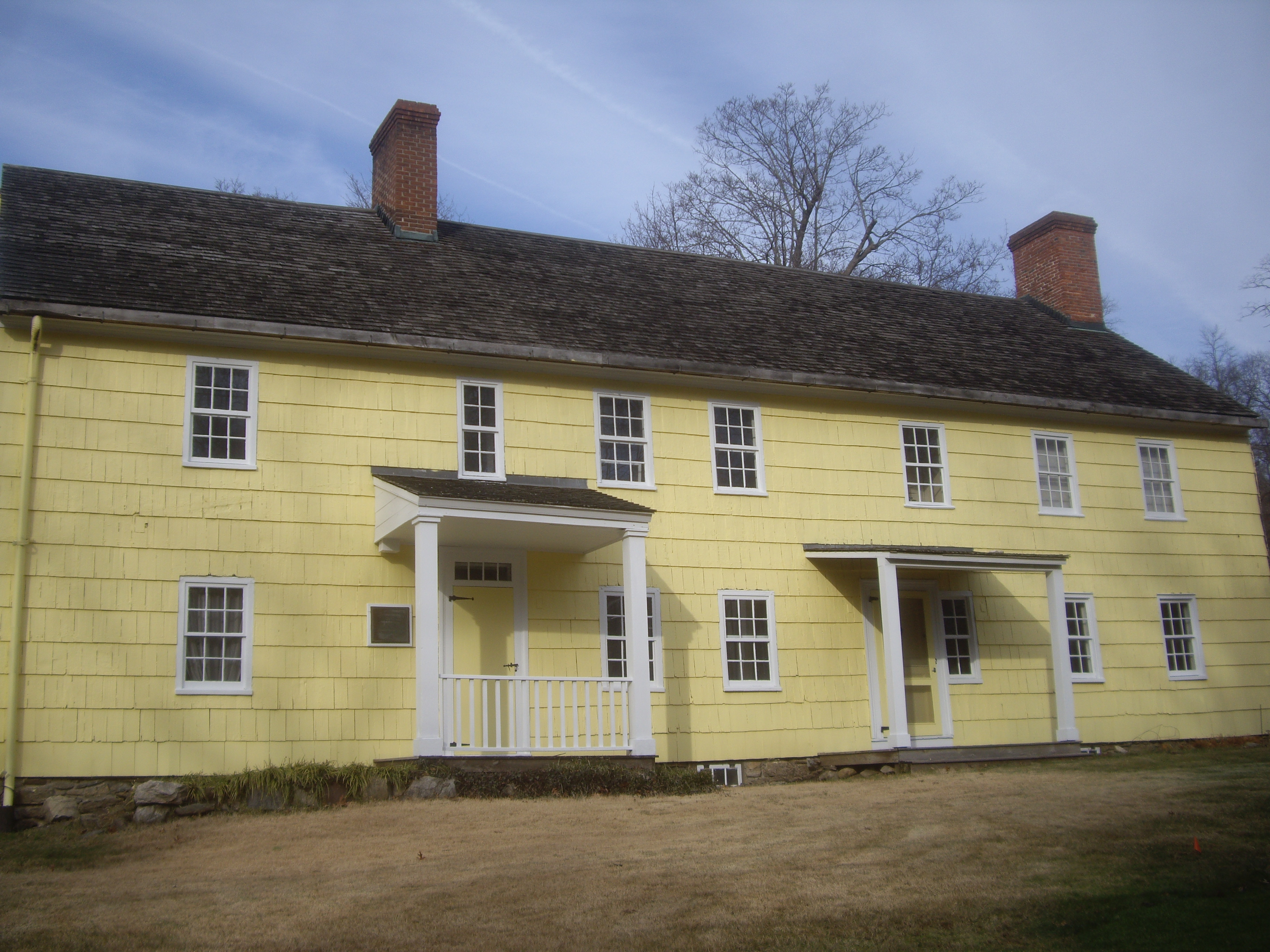
William Sidney Mount House, Stony Brook, NY, restored in 1993.

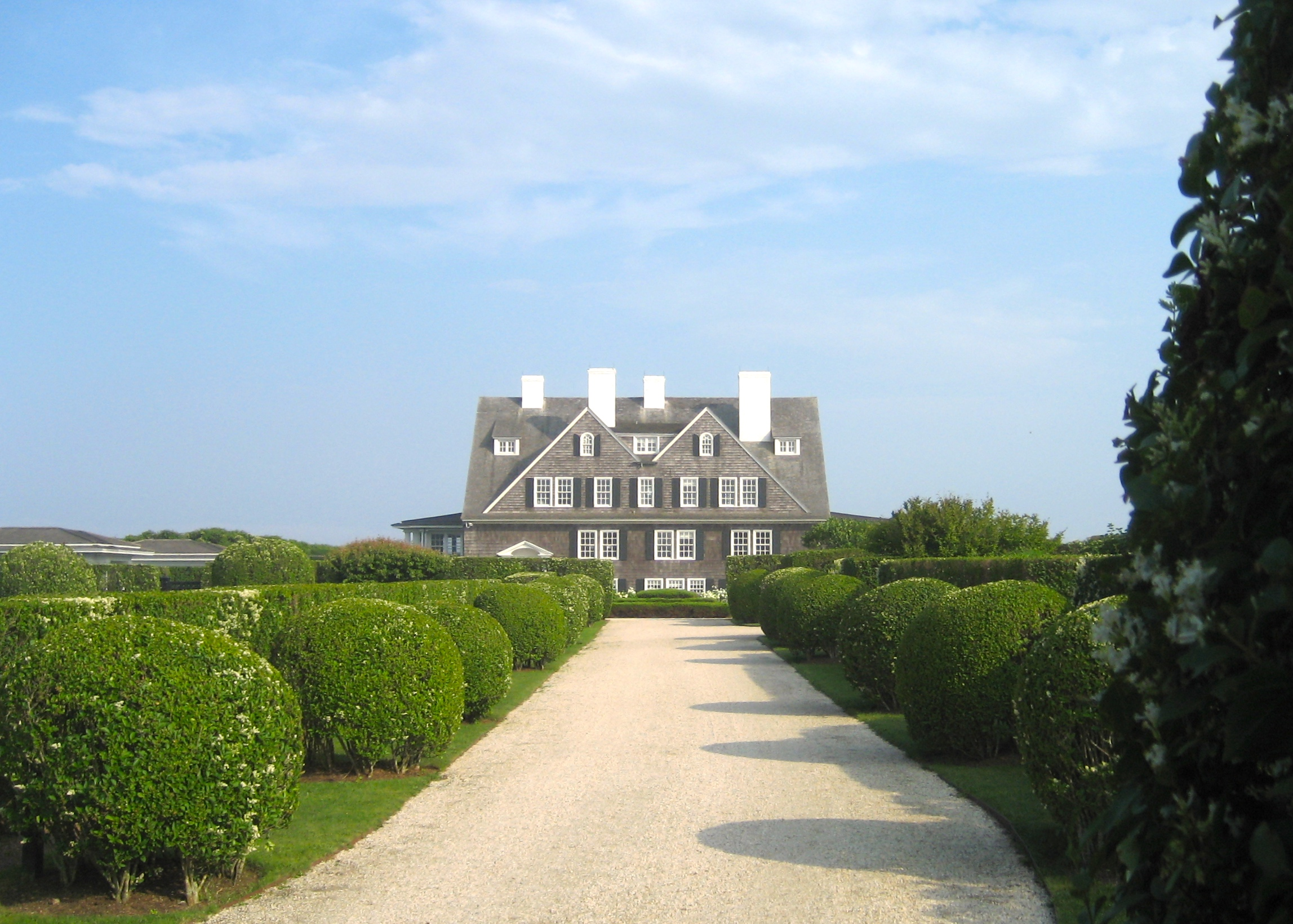
Bonnie Dune, Southampton, NY, restored in 1993.

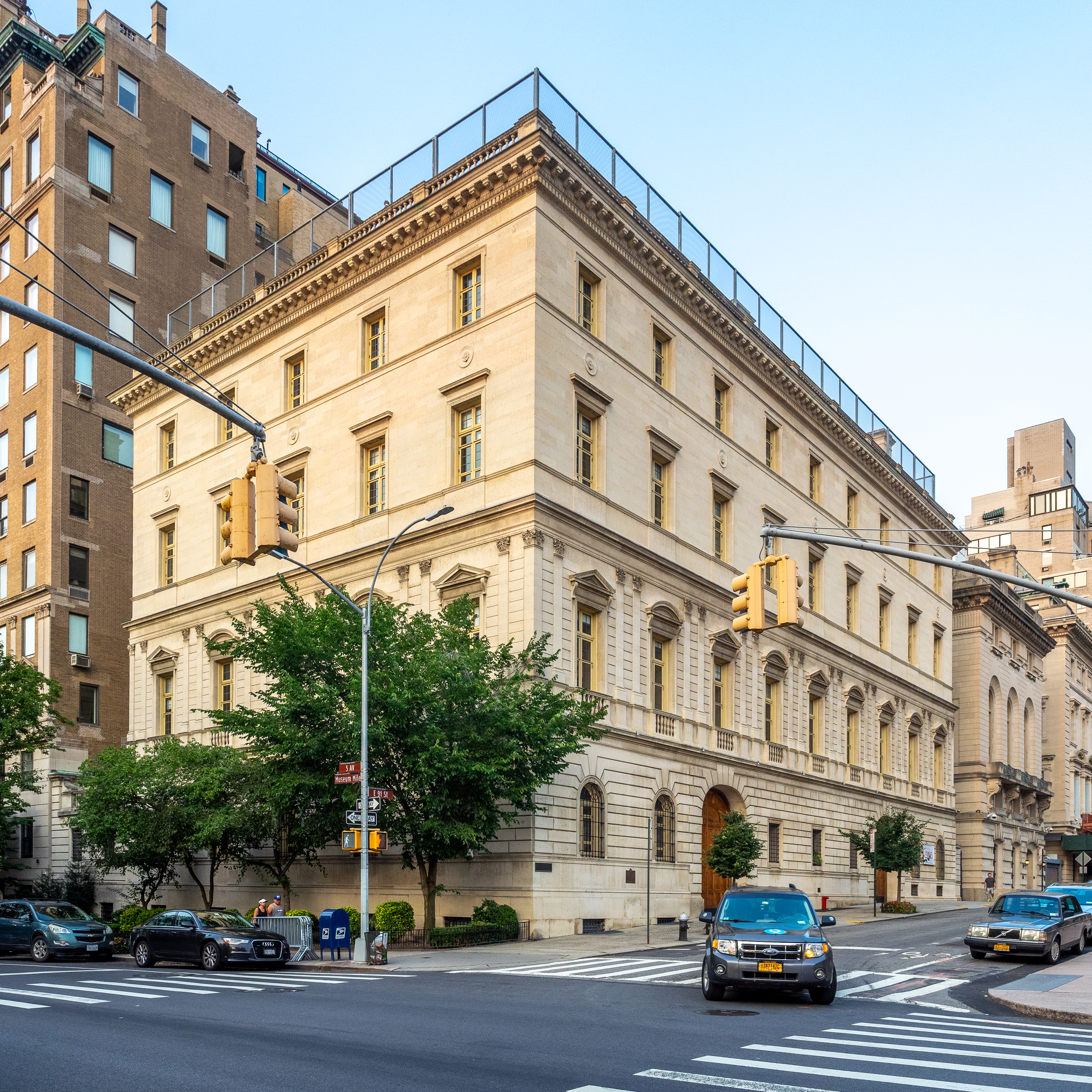
Otto H. Kahn House, New York City, restored in 1994.

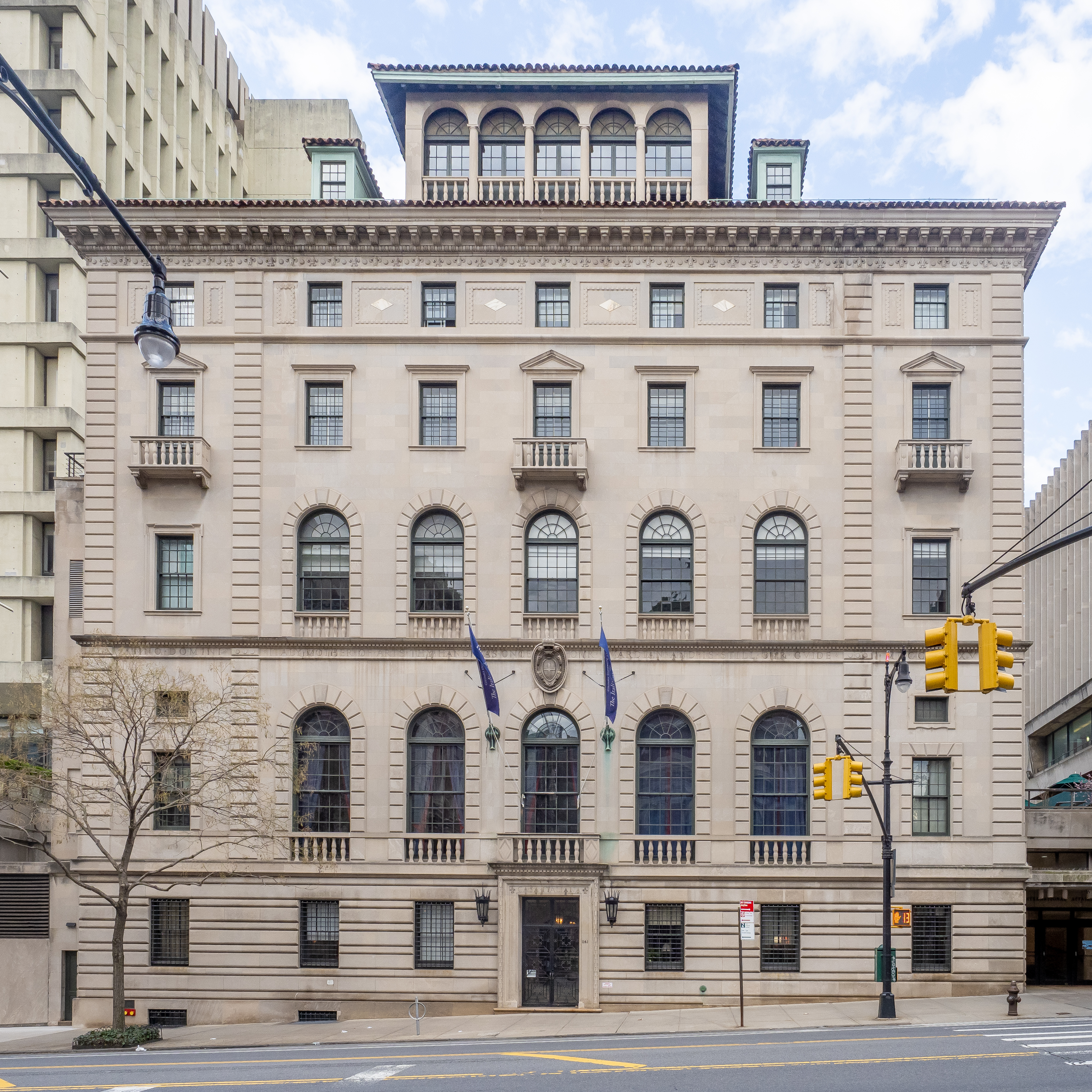
Casa Italiana, Columbia University, New York City, restored in 1996.

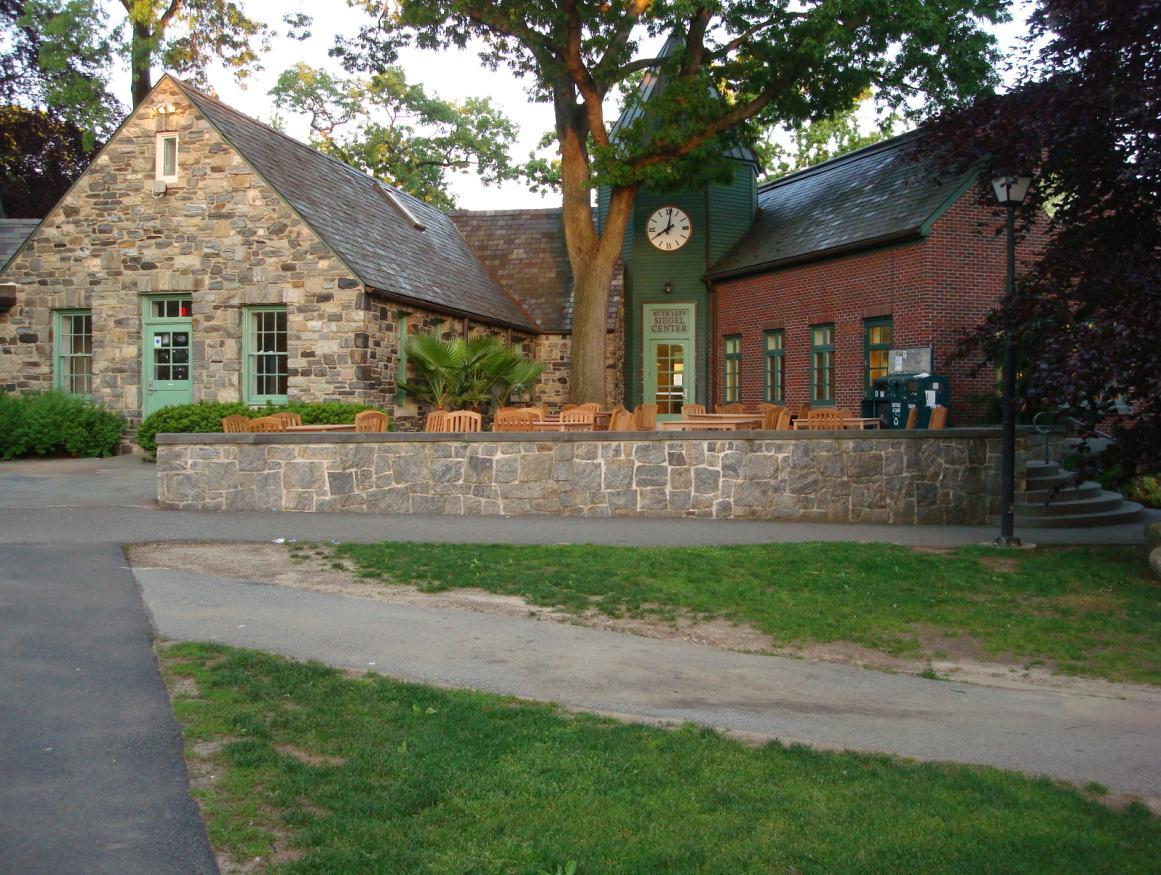
Siegel Student Center, Sarah Lawrence College, addition completed in 1998.

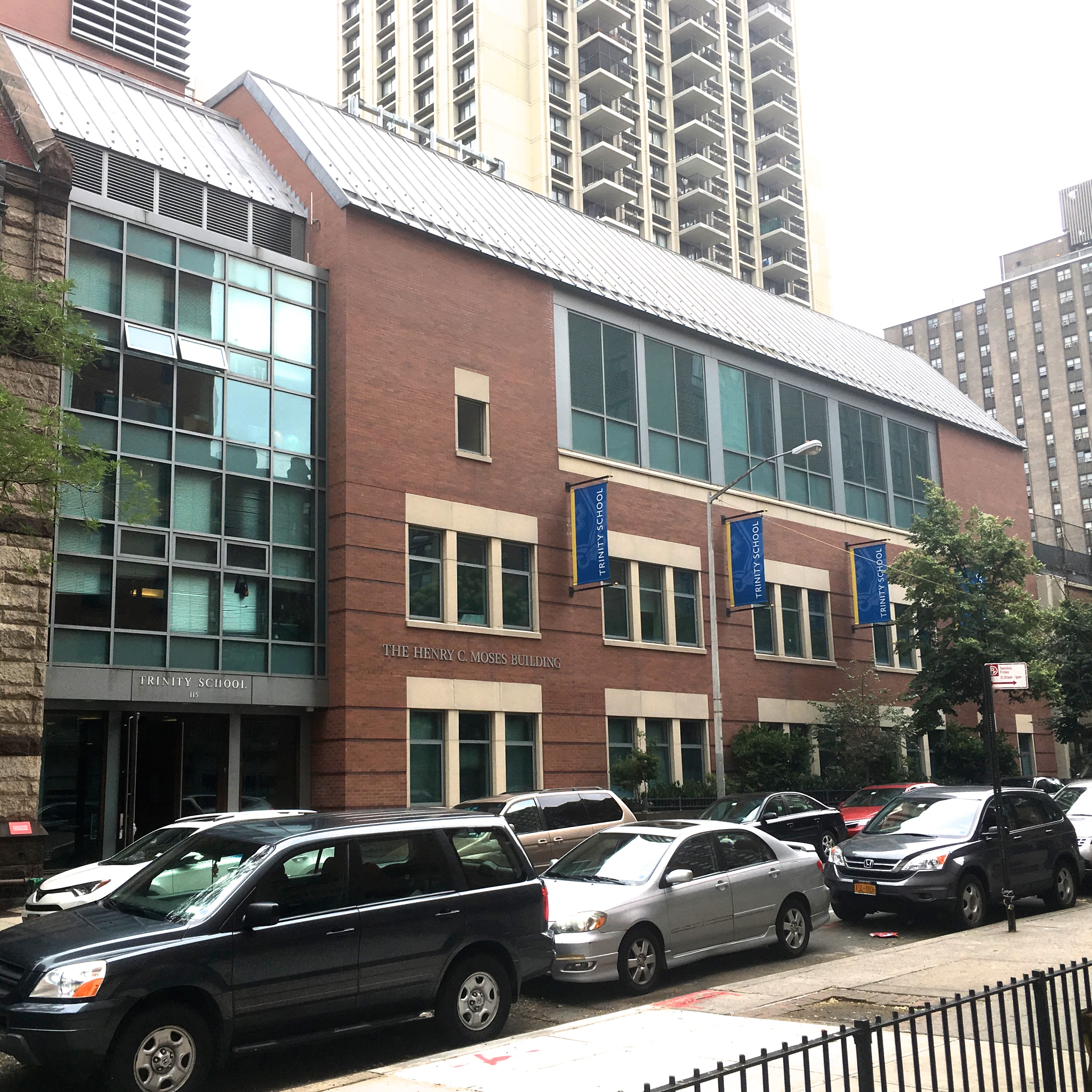
Middle School Building, Trinity School, New York City, completed in 1998.

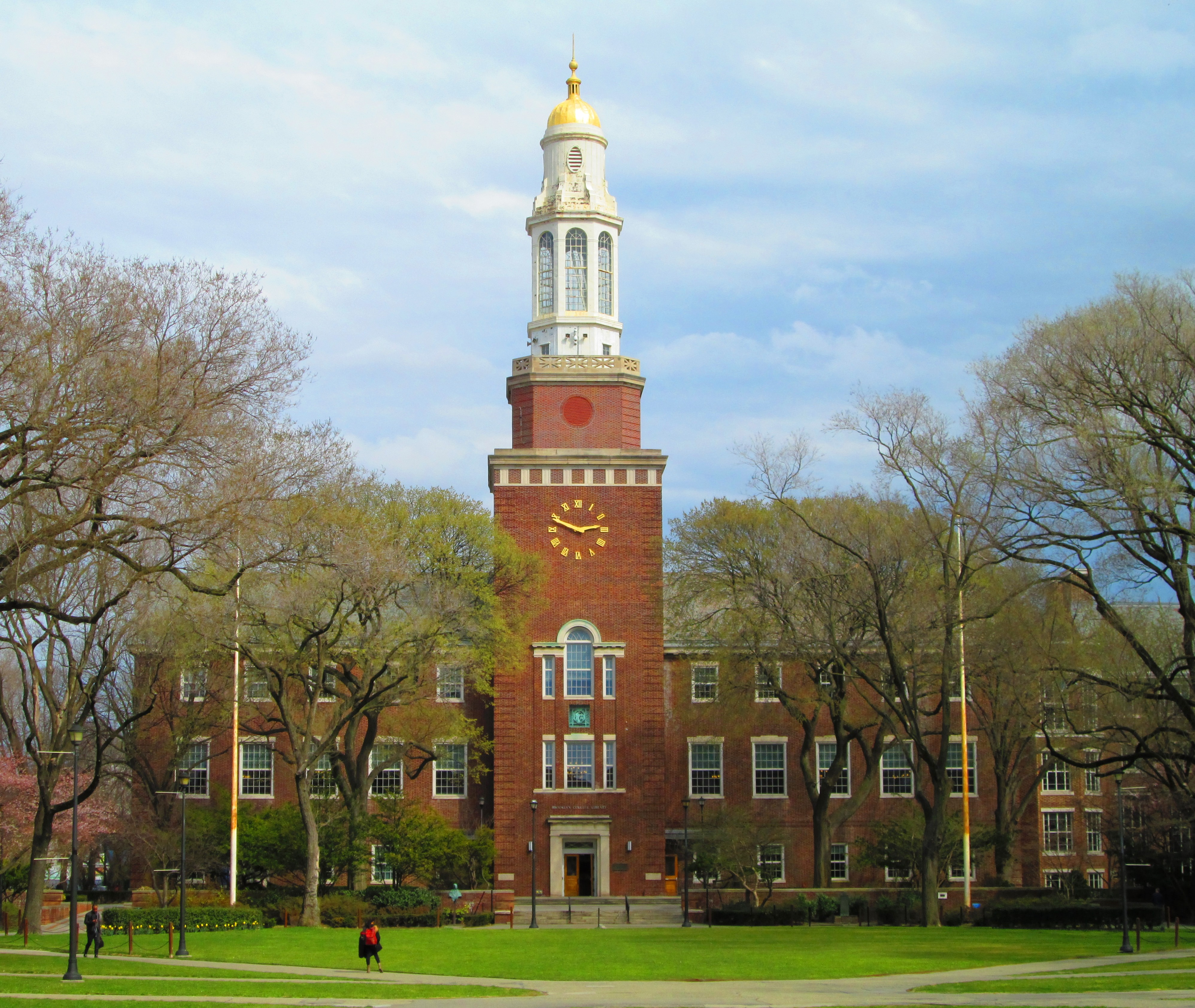
Brooklyn College Library, restored in 2002.

== Written works ==
Among the written works of architects who at one time or another were associates or partners at Buttrick White & Burtis are the following:

- William W. Braham. Modern Color/Modern Architecture: Amédée Ozenfant and the Genealogy of Color in Modern Architecture (London: Ashgate, 2002).
- William W. Braham. Rethinking Technology: A Reader in Architectural Theory (Routledge, 2007).
- William W. Braham. Architecture and Energy: Performance and Style (Routledge, 2013).
- William W. Braham. Energy Accounts: Architectural Representations of Energy, Climate, and the Future (Routledge, 2016).
- Michael Dwyer, ed., with preface by Mark Rockefeller. Great Houses of the Hudson River (Boston, MA: Little, Brown and Company, 2001).
- Michael Dwyer, with a foreword by Mario Buatta. Carolands (Redwood City, CA: San Mateo County Historical Association, 2006).
- Jean Parker Phifer. Public Art New York (New York: W.W. Norton & Co., 2009).
- Samuel G. White. The Houses of McKim, Mead & White (New York: Rizzoli, 1998).
- Samuel G. White and Elizabeth White. McKim, Mead & White: The Masterworks (New York: Rizzoli, 2003).
- Samuel G. White and Elizabeth White. Stanford White Architect (New York: Rizzoli, 2008).
- Samuel G. White. Nice House (New York: The Monacelli Press, 2010).
- Samuel G. White. Stanford White in Detail (New York: The Monacelli Press, 2020).
