= Nicholas Mann (academic) =

Colin Nicholas Jocelyn Mann, CBE, FBA (usually Nicholas or Nico Mann) (born 24 October 1942) is a scholar of Italian humanism, and especially of Petrarch. He was director of the Warburg Institute from 1990 to 2001. He is now an emeritus professor in the University of London.

== Early life and education ==
Mann was born in Salisbury, Wiltshire. He read modern languages and literature at King's College, Cambridge, and completed his PhD there in 1965.

== Career ==
Following his formal education, Mann was a fellow at Clare College from 1965 to 1967. In 1967 he took up a lectureship at the University of Warwick, where he remained until 1972. In 1972 he went to Oxford, where he became a visiting fellow at All Souls in that year, and subsequently a fellow and tutor at Pembroke from 1973. While at Pembroke, Mann took on various roles, including the role as Dean of Graduate Students, and latterly, in the Museum of Modern Art, Oxford, the position of Chairman of the Council.

In 1990, Mann was appointed Director of the Warburg Institute and Professor of the History of the Classical Tradition in the University of London. Mann's years at the Warburg involved him deeply in the administrative apparatus of the University, and he was made Dean of the School of Advanced Study in 2002 and then a Pro-Vice-Chancellor of the University in 2003. Upon his retirement in 2007, he was awarded an emeritus professorship in Renaissance studies in the University.

Mann was elected a Fellow of the British Academy in 1992; he also served as the Academy's Foreign Secretary and Vice-President (1999-2006). Mann was appointed CBE in 1999. He was elected the Vice-President of ALLEA (the federation of European Academies) in 2006 and served in the role from 2007 to 2011. Mann has also been awarded a number of other honours and fellowships.

== Works ==
Mann's scholarly works consider problems in the study of Petrarch and of the early Italian humanists. His brief book of 1984 offered his succinct assessment of the value of Petrarch to the study of the humanists. Petrarch's legacy among Anglophones had suffered due to an over-earnest revival in Tudor England.

While Director of the Warburg, Mann co-edited a number of books, including Giordano Bruno, 1583-1585: The English Experience (with Michele Ciliberto) and Lorenzo the Magnificent: Culture and Politics (with Michael Mallett).

A list of Mann's publications to 2010 is available from the SAS website.
