= Charles Hope (art historian) =

British art historian (born 1945)

Charles Archibald Hope (born April 1945) is a British art historian who was director of the Warburg Institute from 2001 to 2010. He was succeeded by Peter Mack. He is a specialist in Italian art of the 15th and 16th centuries, especially Venetian painting.

== Selected publications ==
- Titian
- Bronzino's 'Allegory' in the National Gallery
- The Chronology of Mantegna's "Triumphs"
- The Early History of the Tempio Malatestiano
- The Genius of Venice, 1500-1600, edited with Jane Martineau
- Giorgione or Titian?: History of a Controversy
