= Enriqueta Harris =

British art historian and writer (1910–2006)

Enriqueta Harris Frankfort
- Born: Enriqueta Harris; 17 May 1910; Hampstead, London, England
- Died: 22 April 2006 (aged 95)
- Education: University College London
- Occupations: Art historian; Writer
- Years active: 1930s–1999
- Spouse: Henri Frankfort (m. 1952; died 1954)
- Awards: Gold Medal of Merit in the Fine Arts; Grand Cross of the Order of Isabella the Catholic

Enriqueta Harris Frankfort (17 May 1910 — 22 April 2006) was a British art historian and writer who specialised in Spanish art. Born into a family with an English father and a Spanish mother, she attended University College London to read modern languages and later studied a Doctor of Philosophy art degree under Tancred Borenius. Harris travelled to Spain to research Caravaggio's influence on 17th-century Spanish paintings and her first book was published in 1938. She billeted Basque child refugees during the Spanish Civil War and worked with the Ministry of Information to keep Spain neutral during World War II. After the war ended she worked in the Warburg Institute and was offered the post in their photographic collection in 1947. Harris worked there until her retirement albeit for two years when she was married to the institution's director Henri Frankfort. Her work on Spanish paintings earned her widespread recognition in the country and received multiple awards and honours.

== Biography ==
=== Early life ===
Enriqueta Harris Frankfort was born on 17 May 1910 in Hampstead, London. Her father, Lionel Harris, was an English art dealer specialising in Spanish paintings, and her mother, Enriqueta Rodriguez, was a Spanish woman who converted to Judaism to marry him. Harris was raised as a Jew, and had one elder brother, Tomás Harris, who was an intelligence agent in World War II and art collector. She was introduced to the world of art at an early age. She attended University College London in 1928 to read the Italian and French languages. Harris was one of the university's first students to enrol in art history courses that were introduced in the curriculum in her second year. She graduated in 1931 but stayed in London to do a Doctor of Philosophy degree under the art historian Tancred Borenius, completing a thesis on the followers of painter Francisco Goya in 1934.

=== Career ===
With a grant from the Leverhulme Foundation, Harris travelled to Spain to research Caravaggio's influence on 17th-century Spanish paintings combining a part-time teaching job at the Courtauld Institute of Art. She attempted to find a museum job but almost none had positions open for women. In Spain Harris met art historian August Liebmann Mayer and became friends with future Museo del Prado director Diego Angulo Íñiguez and the poet Manuel Altolaguirre. She also came into contact with scientists who had emigrated from Germany to the United Kingdom. In 1938, Harris's first book, The Golden Age of Spanish Art, was published. Towards the conclusion of the Spanish Civil War, she arranged for the temporary accommodation of Basque refugee children in England, and then worked for the Ministry of Information's Spanish section, which encouraged Spain to stay neutral during World War II.

Despite the time spent billeting children Harris still conducted her own research while spending six months as a tuition fellow at New York University. She remained in contact with friends during World War II, visiting them at weekends, organising their photographic collections and working in their gardens. After the war ended in 1945 Harris renewed her contract with the Warburg Institute and was offered a post in the institute's Photographic Collection two years later. At the Warburg she met Henri Frankfort, a distinguished archaeologist and the institute's director, and married him in 1952 after Frankfort divorced his wife. Their marriage ended two years later following Frankfort's death. Harris returned to her position at the Warburg Institute as her marriage led to her resigning her job. She spent multiple years reviewing books and attending exhibitions saw new articles relating to Diego Velázquez's paintings and life.

=== Later career and death ===
Harris served on the Royal Academy Winter Exhibition's executive committee of 1963–64 and produced a conglomeration of Goya-related articles which had little or unknown information about the painter. She later published an appraisal of his life and work in a book for Phaidon Press in 1969. The following year she announced her retirement from the university. Her book on Velázquez was published in 1982. During Harris's later years arthritis made it more difficult for her to travel and work in libraries, but formed collaborative enterprises with her extensive knowledge and shrewd judgement at the disposition of younger scholars. She funded lecture series at University College London and fellowships at the Warburg Institute.

Harris's work on Spanish paintings garnered widespread recognition in the country, being made a Real Academia de Bellas Artes de San Fernando corresponding member in Madrid. In 1989 she received the Gold Medal of Merit in the Fine Arts from Juan Carlos I, and the Grand Cross of the Order of Isabella the Catholic in 2002. The published homage of the Friends of the Prado Museum Foundation came in 2002. She died on 22 April 2006 at the age of 95. Harris was survived by her stepson and his family. The Warburg Institute holds material bequeathed by Harris in its Photographic Collection. They include her personal papers and photographs connected to her lifetime's work.

== Bibliography ==
- Velázquez (1982), In English; 1991, In Spanish and French, Reissued in 2003.
- Études complètes sur Velázquez (1999), In Spanish and English, (2006).
- Goya (1994), Phaidon Press Limited, ISBN 9780714829753.
