= Bill Sherman (literary scholar) =

American-born British academic

Director of the Warburg Institute
- Incumbent
- Assumed office 2017
- Preceded by: David Freedberg

Personal details
- Born: 26 January 1966 (age 60) Saint Paul, Minnesota
- Education: Columbia University (BA); University of Cambridge (PhD)
- Occupation: Academic; Administrator

William H. Sherman (born 26 January 1966) is an American-born British academic who is director of the Warburg Institute.

== Biography ==
Sherman was born on 26 January 1966, in Saint Paul, Minnesota. He received his B.A. from Columbia University in 1988, a M.Phil. and Ph.D. from the University of Cambridge.

Sherman taught English at the University of Maryland, College Park from 1993 to 2004, before moving to the University of York, where he taught English literature from 2005 to 2013, and founded its Centre for Renaissance and Early Modern Studies, of which he also served as director until 2011.

He joined Victoria and Albert Museum as head of research in 2014, and was named director of research and collections in 2016.

In 2017, he was named director of the Warburg Institute at the School of Advanced Study, University of London.
