= Edgar Wind =

British art historian (1900–1971)

- Born: 14 May 1900; Berlin, German Empire
- Died: 12 September 1971 (aged 71); London, United Kingdom
- Awards: Guggenheim Award, 1950

Academic background
- Education: University of Hamburg
- Thesis: Ästhetischer und kunstwissenschaftlicher Gegenstand. Ein Beitrag zur Methodologie der Kunstgeschichte

Academic work
- Discipline: Art History
- Institutions: Warburg Institute; University of Oxford
- Notable works: Pagan Mysteries in the Renaissance, Art and Anarchy

Edgar Wind (/wɪnd/; 14 May 1900 – 12 September 1971) was a British interdisciplinary art historian, specializing in iconology in the Renaissance era. He was a member of the school of art historians associated with Aby Warburg and the Warburg Institute as well as the first Professor of art history at Oxford University.

Wind is best remembered for his research in allegory and the use of pagan mythology during the 15th and 16th centuries, and for his book on the subject, Pagan Mysteries in the Renaissance.

== Biography ==
Wind was born in Berlin, Germany, one of the two children of Maurice Delmar Wind, an Argentinian merchant of Russian Jewish ancestry, and his Romanian wife Laura Szilard.

He received a thorough training in mathematics and philosophical studies, both at his Gymnasium in Charlottenburg, and then at university in Berlin, Freiburg, and Vienna. He completed his dissertation in Hamburg, where he was Erwin Panofsky's first student.

Wind left to teach briefly in the United States for financial reasons (he had a two-year appointment at the University of North Carolina from 1925 to 1927), but then returned to Hamburg as a research assistant. It was there that he got to know Aby Warburg, and was instrumental in moving the Warburg Library out of Germany to London during the Nazi period. Warburg's influence on Wind's own methods was significant.

Once in London, Wind taught and became involved with the Warburg Institute, helping found the Journal of the Warburg and Courtauld Institute in 1937. During the war he returned to the US and remained there, holding several teaching positions, at New York University, University of Chicago, and Smith College. He received a Guggenheim Fellowship in 1950.

In 1955, Wind returned to England and became Oxford University's first professor of art history, a position he occupied until his retirement in 1967. He died in London. A reading room in Oxford's new Sackler Library is dedicated to him, where his works are stored. Wind, although considered a classicist and Renaissance expert, staunchly defended modern art, unlike many of his colleagues: "If modern art is sometimes shrill," he said, "it is not the fault of the artist alone. We all tend to raise our voices when we speak to persons who are getting deaf."

Oxford University's student art and art history society is named after him.

In 2021, Bernardino Branca and Fabio Tononi founded the Edgar Wind Journal (ISSN 2785-2903).

== Teaching ==
Wind was an enthusiastic and respected lecturer at many institutions. He was a key example of the encyclopedic phenomenon of the "Warburgian scholar" in the American academic scene, equally at home in art, literature, history, and philosophy, and giving "pyrotechnical lectures." Says one student of Wind's at Smith, "his Hamburg accent and his puckish smile ... remain the most delightful memories...his...charisma...is the quality that made the greatest impression... [His] utterly charming European manner, urbane, intellectual must have been stimulating and encouraging to [his colleagues.]" Wind was a crucial influence on the young R.B. Kitaj, who enrolled at the Ruskin School, Oxford in early 1957, introducing him to the work and legacy of Aby Warburg. He personally encouraged Kitaj, inviting him to tea with him and his wife, Margaret, at his flat in Belsyre Court. Someone who in 1967 attended his Oxford lectures on the Sistine ceiling recalls the packed house at the Sheldonian Theatre, the vast erudition behind the tracing of the "theology" of Michelangelo's figures, and simply the excitement of learning about the order of one Renaissance world picture.

== Work ==
Wind's two most famous works are Pagan Mysteries in the Renaissance and Art and Anarchy.

=== Pagan Mysteries in the Renaissance ===
Mysteries' chief aim was to "elucidate a number of great Renaissance works of art". He maintained that "ideas forcefully expressed in art were alive in other areas of human endeavor". His thesis was that "the presence of unresolved residues of meaning is an obstacle to the enjoyment of art", and he attempted to "help remove the veil of obscurity which not only distance in time...but a deliberate obliqueness in the use of metaphor has spread over some of the greatest Renaissance paintings."

Wind's book has been heavily criticised (by André Chastel, Carlo Ginzburg, E.H. Gombrich, and others) for frequent misreadings of sources and a "one-sided" fixation on the Neoplatonic perspective.

=== Art and Anarchy ===
In 1960, the BBC invited Wind to present the annual Reith Lectures. In this series of six radio talks, titled Art and Anarchy, he examined why, and how, great art is often produced in turbulent circumstances.

These lectures were later compiled into a book, also entitled Art and Anarchy. In it he notes that, over time, public audiences have lost their capacity for an immediate and visceral response to art. The production and appreciation of art, he observes, has become marginalized and domesticated to a point where it can no longer significantly and lastingly move its addressees. Wind's impulse in the piece is apparently restorative; he seeks to impede the observed tendency toward apathy and recover some of art's latent anarchic quality.

Wind begins his argument by presenting the long-standing conceptual correlation between art and forces of chaos or disorder, citing a lineage of thinkers and artists including Plato, Goethe, Baudelaire and Burckhardt. Particular emphasis is placed on Plato's distrustful view of the imagination as fundamentally uncontrollable; Plato explicitly denied the true artist a place in his imagined ideal republic, not for lack of respect for the artist's talent but out of fear for his capacity to upset the social balance. Wind also notes the repeated historical coincidence – in Greece at Plato's time and in Italy during the Renaissance – of peaks in artistic accomplishment with political turmoil and breakdown.

Wind notes, however, that the recent surplus of artwork available to the public eye has to some extent anesthetized the audience to art at large. Wind is quick to acknowledge that society maintains a broad and active concern with art as well as increasingly refined faculties with which to interpret such work. Yet this interest is a significant dilution of the passion with which art was received in the past: “We are much given to art, but it touches us lightly…art is so well-received because it has lost its sting.”

Wind refers frequently to Hegel in isolating the particular change that art has undergone: “when art is removed to a zone of safety, it may still remain very good art indeed, and also very popular art, but its effect on our existence will vanish.” Art has thus, according to Wind, moved to life's periphery. Again, Wind notes that this distance carries with it certain benefits for the scholarly approach to art; “detachment brought freshness and breadth, and a freedom from prejudice, a willingness to explore the unfamiliar, even the repulsive, and to risk new adventures of sensibility.” At the same time, however, art has lost its ability to resonate at levels deeper than the intellect, to incite the passions. Engaging with a work of art has become an act of mere observation as opposed to “vital participation.” Art has, for Wind, gained interest at the expense of potency.

By way of resolution, Wind suggests an intermediate and integrative approach, supplementing the tolerance afforded by aesthetic detachment with an insistence on personal assessment on behalf of the work's audience: “We should react to a work of art on two levels: we should judge it aesthetically in its own terms, but we should also decide whether we find those terms acceptable.” As such, Wind indicates that the intellectual advantages of the contemporary approach to art may be retained without sacrificing the “directly [felt]” quality that is so fundamental to it.
