= Ballplayers House =

Building in Central Park, New York City

Coordinates: 40°46′13.08″N 73°58′33.3″W

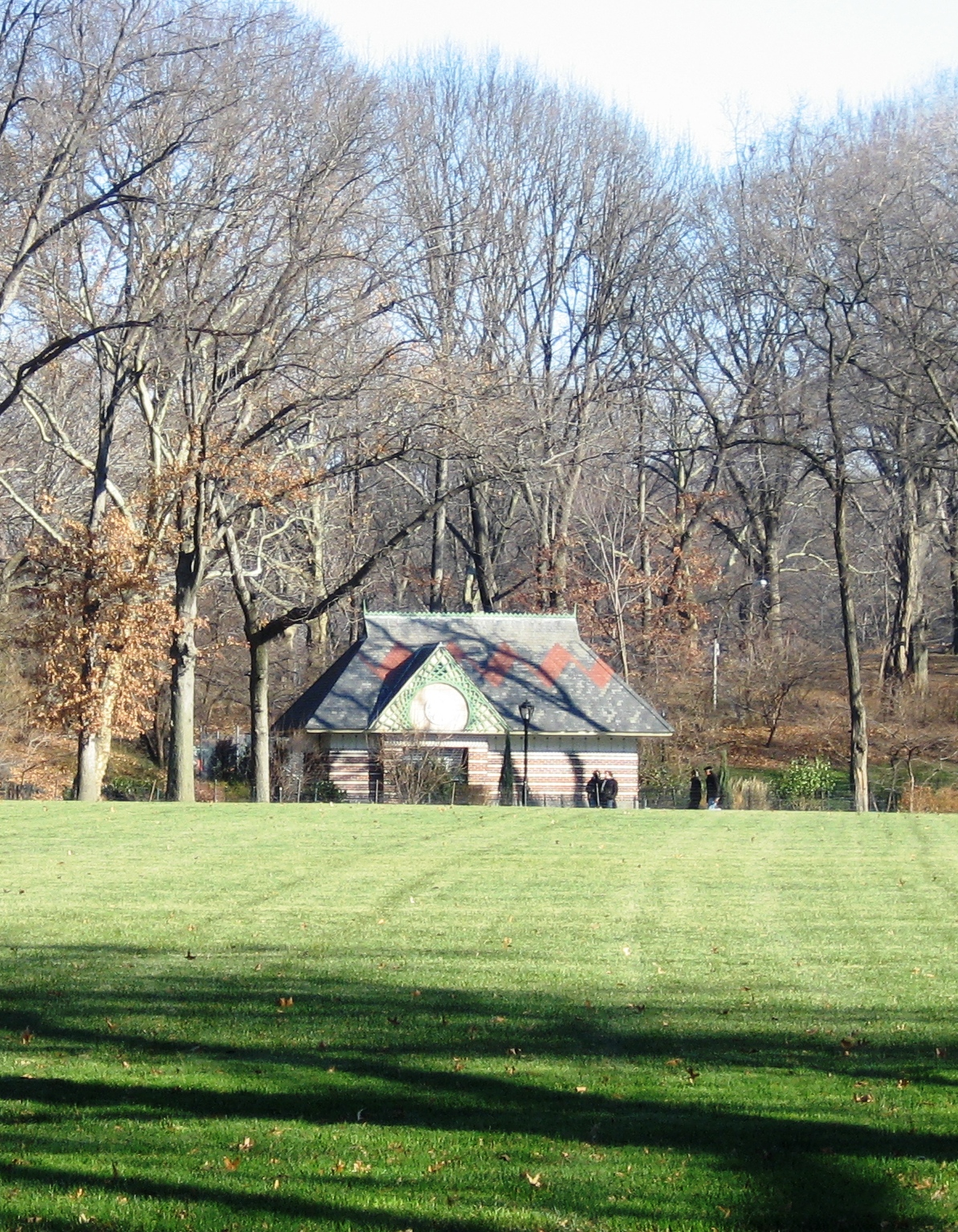
Ballplayers House, built in 1990

The Ballplayers House or Ballfields Café is a 450-square-foot (42 m^{2}) building in Central Park in Manhattan, New York City, designed by the architecture firm Buttrick White & Burtis. Completed in 1990, it replaced an older building, architect Calvert Vaux's Boys Play House of 1868, which stood on the northern edge of the Heckscher Ballfields until it was demolished in 1969. Vaux's building was a 1 1/2-story (plus basement), 52-foot (16 m) long clubhouse and dispensary for bats and balls, whereas Buttrick White & Burtis' building is a 1-story food concession half the length of the original.

== Design ==
The Ballplayers House recalls Vaux's design, albeit much altered in form and detail. In contrast to the brick and bluestone facade of Vaux's building, with its pointed arches and polychrome voussoirs, the facade of Ballplayers House is composed with graphic stripes of highly contrasting brick. An encaustic tile frieze with a simple flower motif and a zig-zag pattern, symbolizes a ball bouncing across a baseball field. In lieu of Vaux's bracketed eaves, pointed pinnacles and chamfered chimney, the new building boasts a simple roofline, topped with a sleek, factory-made, metal cresting.

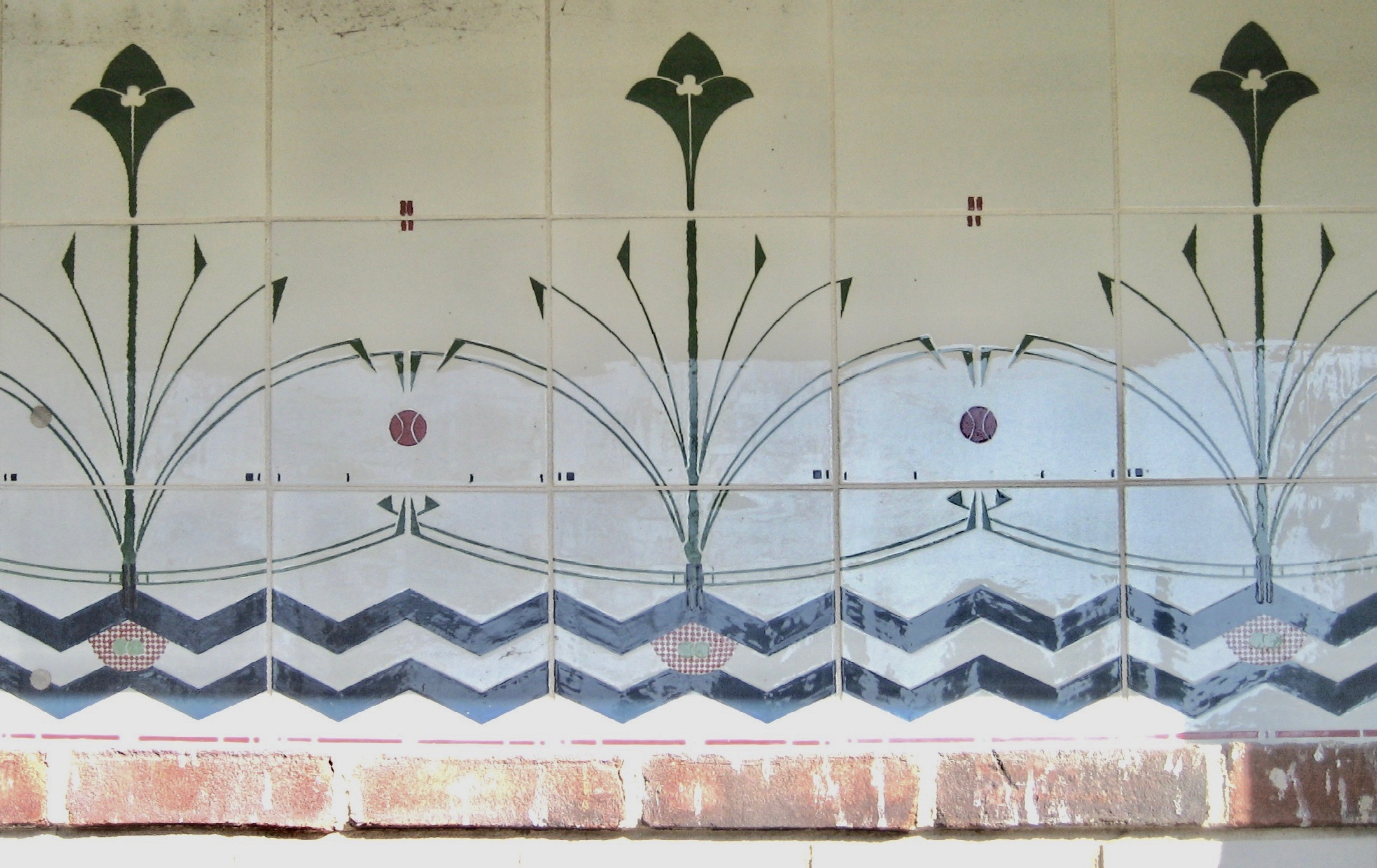
Tile Frieze at the Ballplayers House

Elizabeth Barlow Rogers, president of the Central Park Conservancy when the Ballplayers House was built, described its design as "a contemporary interpretation of Vaux's style."

== Historic gallery ==
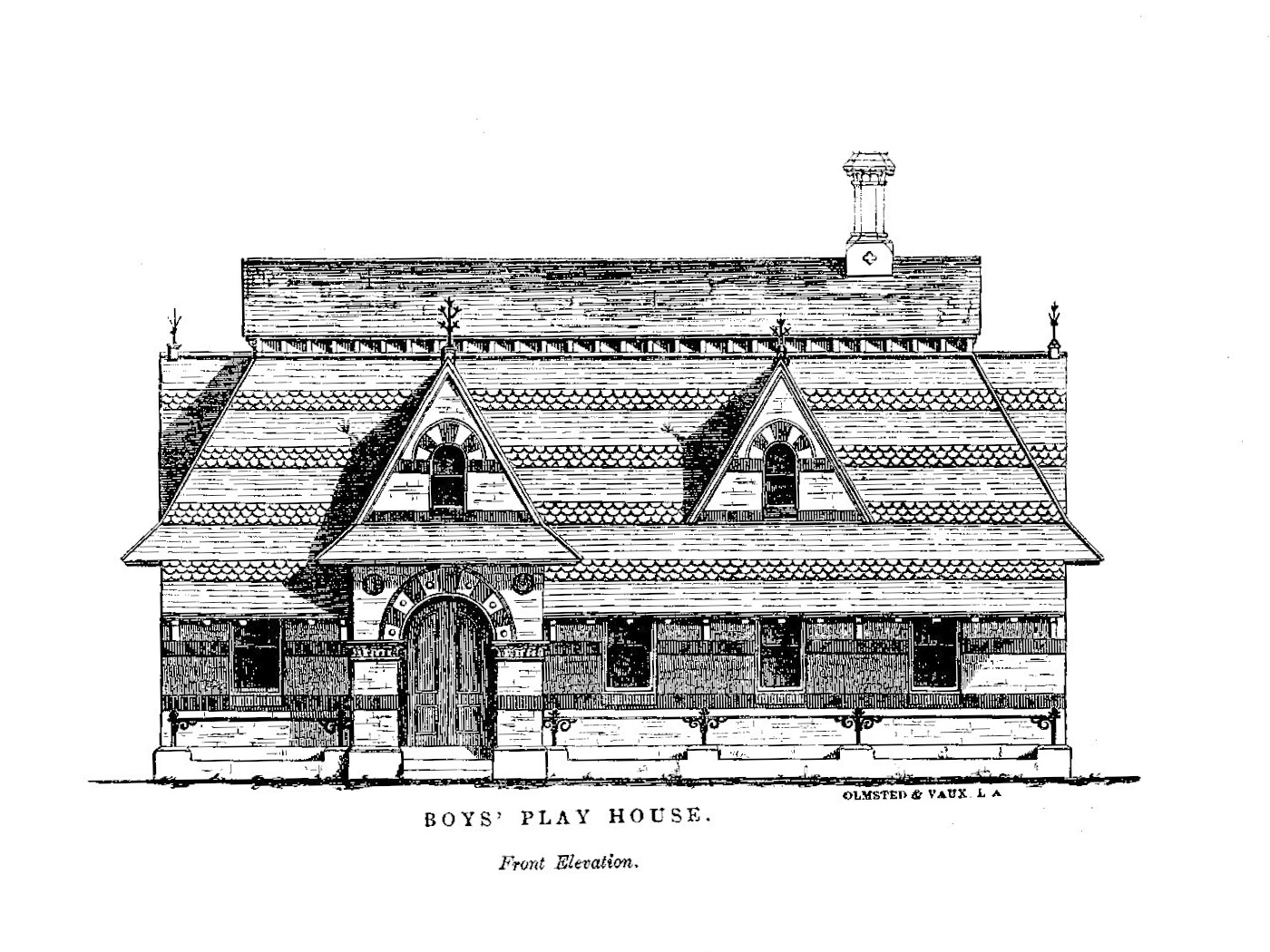
Boys Play House, built in 1868 and demolished in 1969.

1868 Map of Central Park, showing the Boys Play House just south (left) of "Road No. 1"

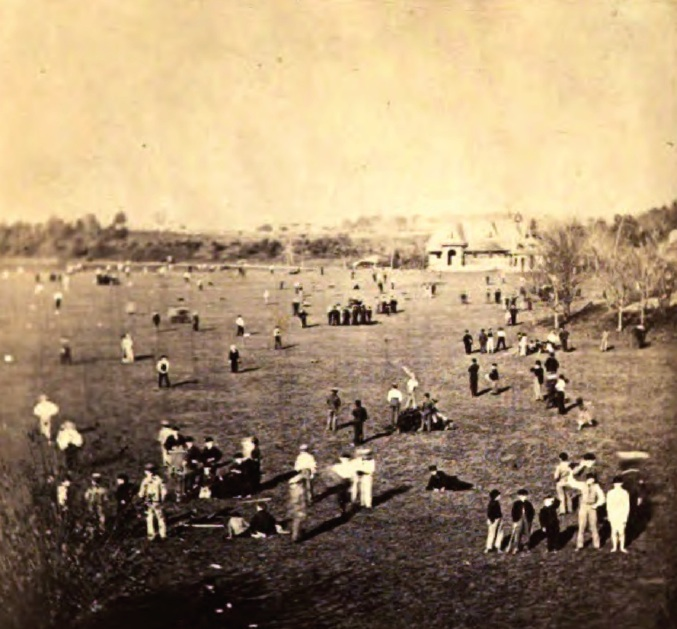
Ball Field and Boys Play House, 1869

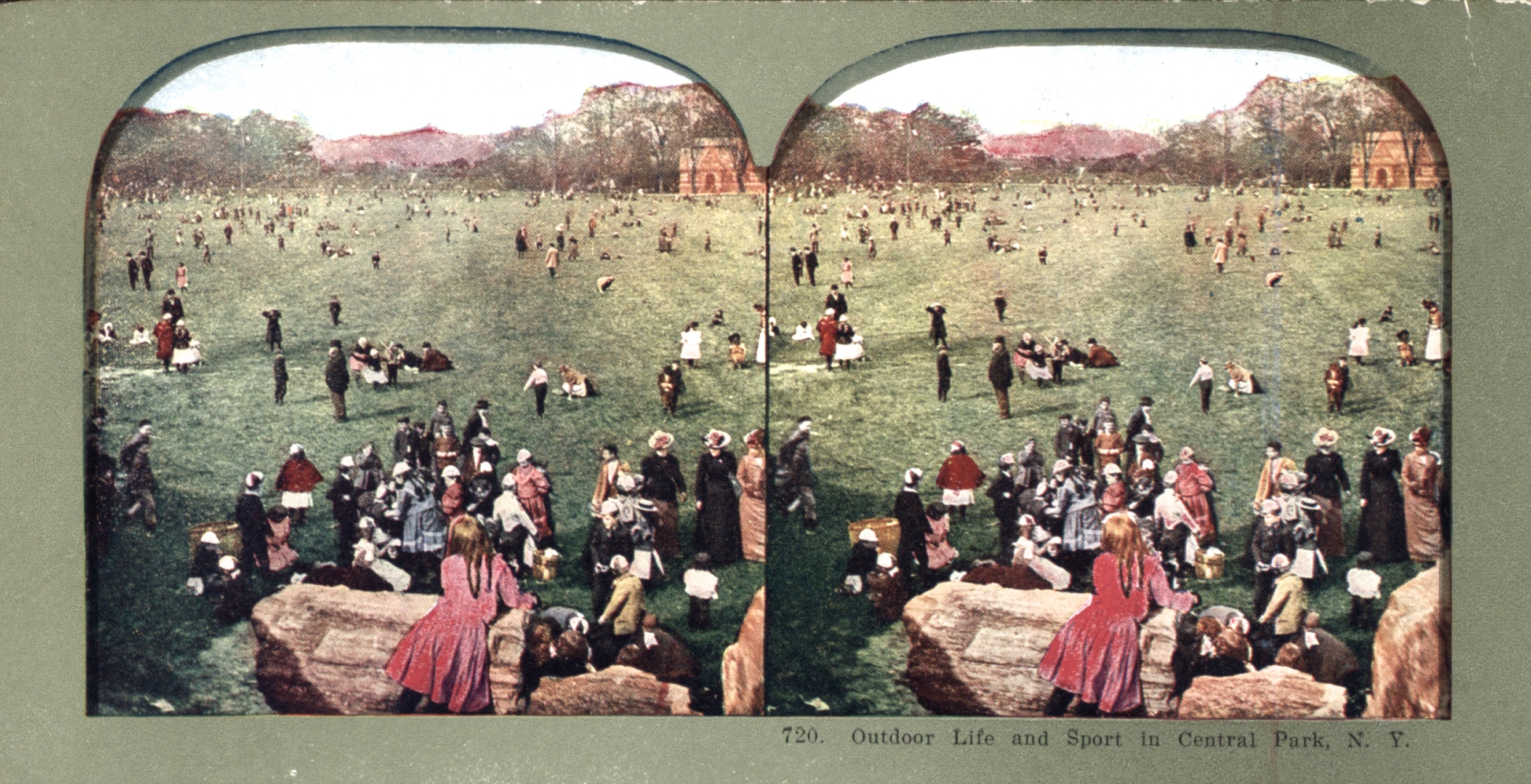
An 1870 Stereoscope view of the Boys Playground with architect Calvert Vaux's Boys Play House in the distance.

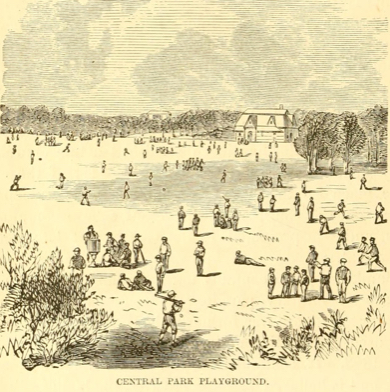
A sketch of the Boys Playground in 1871

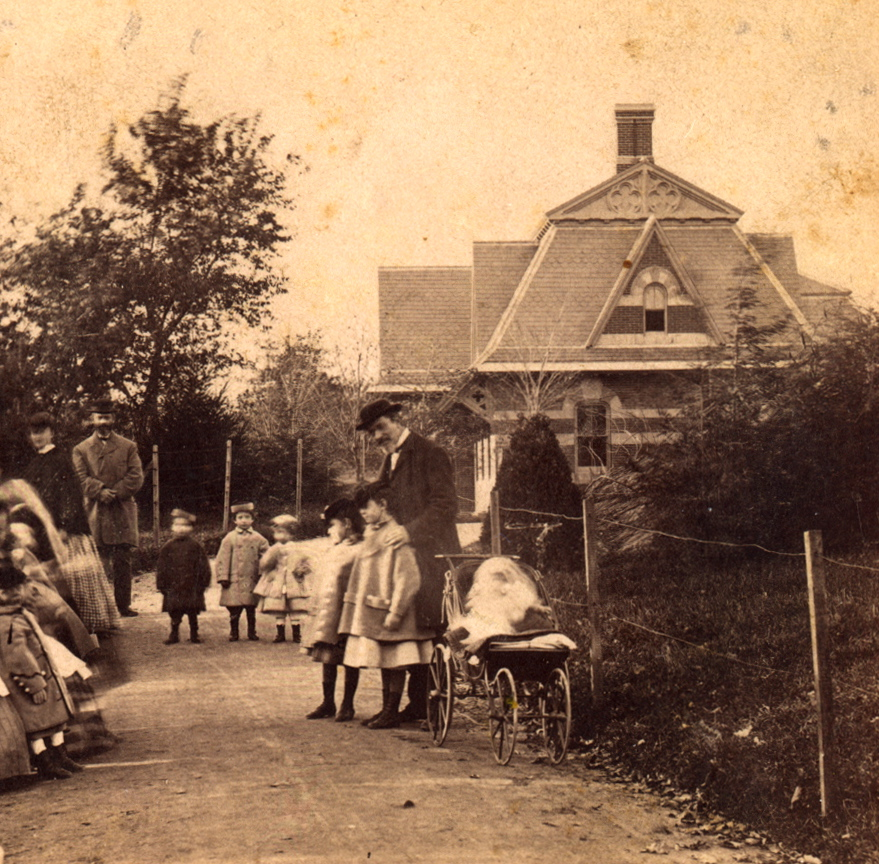
A View of the Boys Play House
