= Warburg Institute =

Research institution in London, England

Coordinates: 51.5234°N 0.1304°W

The Warburg Institute
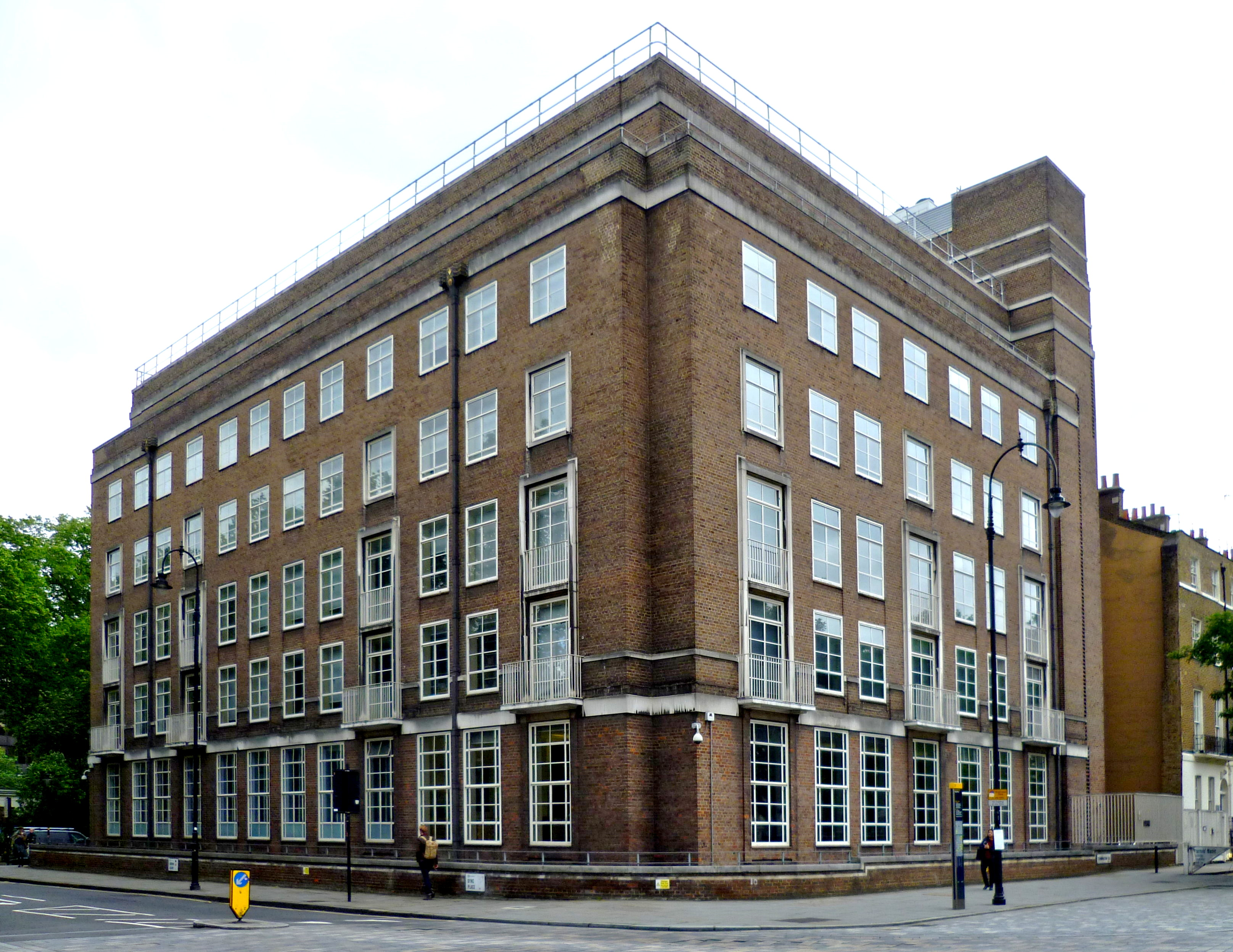
- Established: 1900, as the Kulturwissenschaftliche Bibliothek Warburg (K.B.W.) (Warburg Cultural Science Library); 1926, as the Warburg Institute; 1944, affiliated to the University of London
- Parent institution: School of Advanced Study, University of London
- Director: Bill Sherman
- Location: London, England, United Kingdom
- Website: www.warburg.sas.ac.uk

The Warburg Institute is a research institution associated with the University of London in central London, England. A member of the School of Advanced Study, its focus is the study of cultural history and the role of images in culture – cross-disciplinary and global.

The research of the Warburg Institute is historical, philological and anthropological. It is dedicated to the study of the survival and transmission of cultural forms – whether in literature, art, music or science – across borders and from the earliest times to the present including especially the study of the influence of classical antiquity on all aspects of European civilisation.

Based originally in Hamburg, Germany, in 1933 the collection was moved to London, where it became incorporated into the University of London in 1944. Following a major renovation from 2022 to 2024 the institute became open to public access.

== History ==
=== Hamburg ===
The institute was formed in Hamburg, Germany, from the library of Aby Warburg (1866–1929), a student of Renaissance art and culture, and a scion of the wealthy Jewish Warburg family.

As an art historian, Warburg had become dissatisfied with an aestheticising approach to art history and was interested in a more philosophical and interdisciplinary approach. While studying the culture of Renaissance Florence, he grew interested in the influence of antiquity on modern culture, and the study of this second life of the Classical World became his life work.

In 1900, he decided to establish the Warburg-Bibliothek für Kulturwissenschaft (Warburg Library of the Science of Culture), but, although he had begun collecting books in 1886, he did not actually establish his library until 1909.

Warburg was joined in 1913 by the Vienna art historian Fritz Saxl (1890–1948). They discussed the possibility of converting the library into a research institute in 1914, but World War I and illness interfered. After Warburg returned to Hamburg in 1924, he and Saxl initiated the process of conversion, and the Warburg-Bibliothek officially opened its doors as a research institute in 1926.

Eventually, the privately funded library, built around the interdisciplinary approach, became extensive. Warburg "famously forfeited his right to a share of his fortune on condition that his younger brother Max would buy him any books he required".

The institute was later affiliated with the University of Hamburg. Neo-Kantian philosopher and professor at the newly founded University Ernst Cassirer used it, and his students Erwin Panofsky and Edgar Wind worked there.

The original Warburg Library building in Hamburg is now a research institute, Warburg-Haus Hamburg.

=== London ===
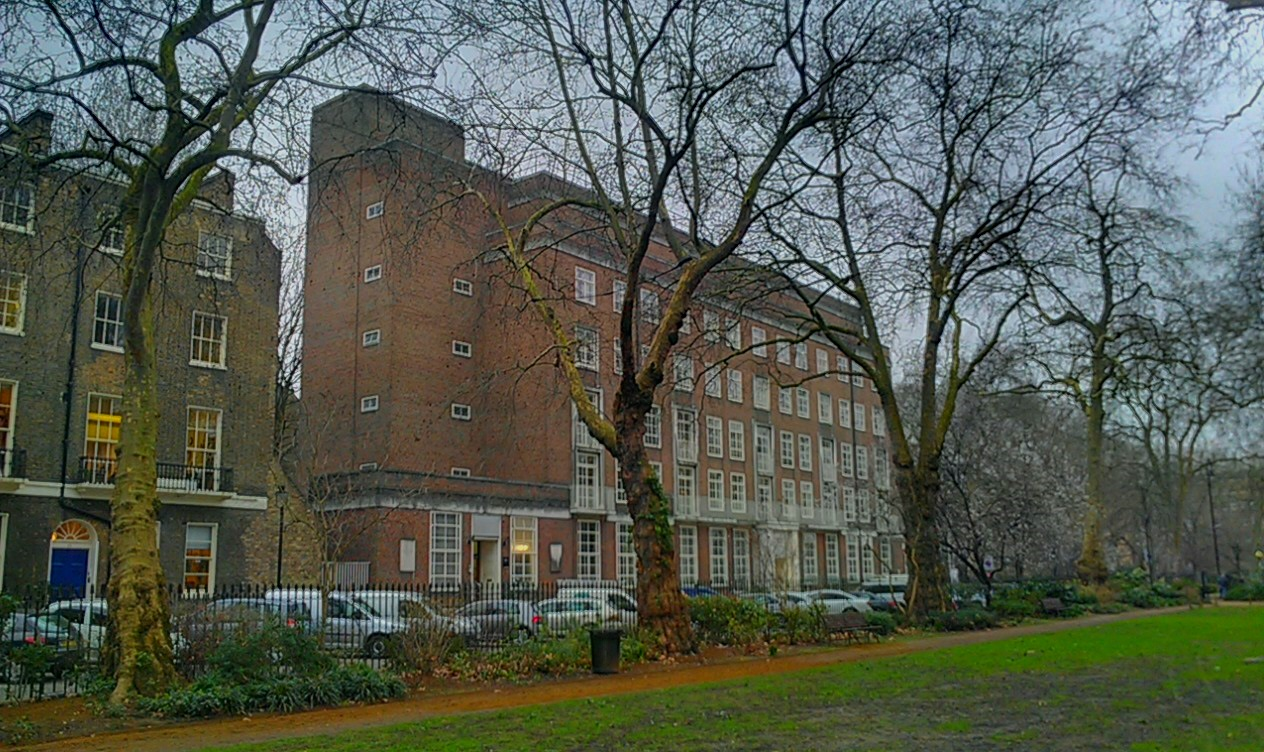
Warburg Institute as seen from Woburn Square

In 1933, under the shadow of Nazism, the institute was relocated to London, where, with the aid of Lord Lee of Fareham, Samuel Courtauld, and the Warburg family, it was installed in Thames House in 1934. The institute moved to the Imperial Institute Buildings in 1937. In 1944 it became associated with the University of London.

The Dutch Egyptologist Henri Frankfort succeeded Saxl as director in 1949, and in 1955 was succeeded by Gertrud Bing, who had joined the organisation in 1922. During her term as director, the institute moved to its current home at the university in 1958. Bing was succeeded by Ernst Gombrich in 1959. From 1976 to 1990, J. B. Trapp was director, and from 1991 to 2001, Nicholas Mann. In 1994 the Warburg became a founding institute of the University of London's School of Advanced Study.

Recent directors have been Charles Hope (2001 to 2010), Peter Mack (2010 to 2014) and David Freedberg (from July 2015 to April 2017).

In 2011, legal action was started by the University of London together with the institute's advisory council about their disagreement regarding the meaning of the 1944 deed of trust that granted the university the collection; the pledge "to maintain and preserve the collection 'in perpetuity' as 'an independent unit'" is problematised by the institute's annual deficit, estimated at half a million pounds. Several students and scholars who had used the Warburg resources or studied there protested against this planned merge. A petition on Change.org to save the Warburg's independence was started by Brooke Palmieri, a student of University College London after working on their PhD thesis at the Warburg. In only two months, the petition had almost twenty five thousand signatures. In recent years the university has charged a proportion of its total estate expenditure to the Warburg Institute; as a result, the finances of the once solvent Institute have been strongly affected. In November 2014, a High Court judgement established that the university's conduct in this regard was not lawful.

== Building ==
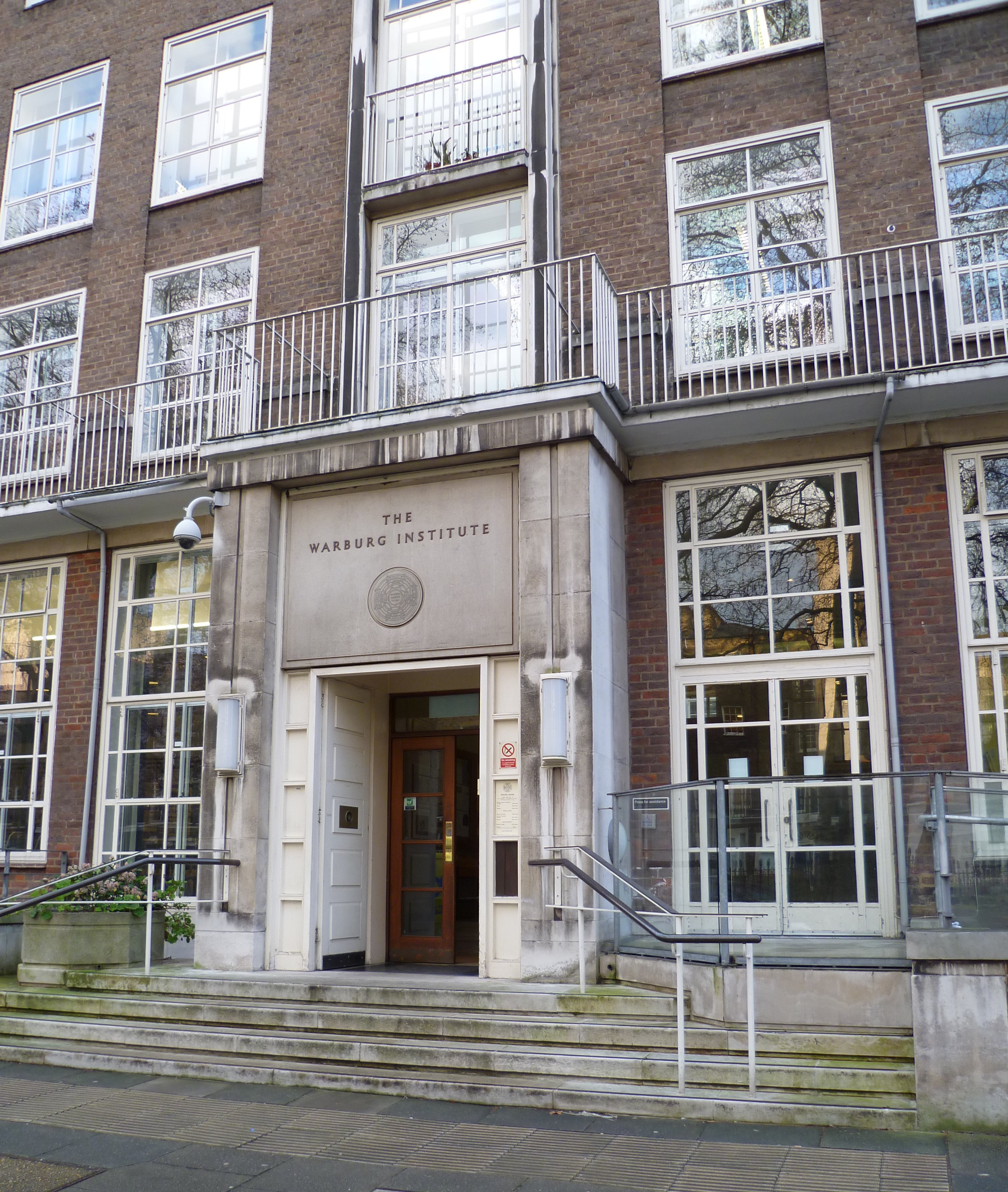
Entrance to the Warburg Institute in Woburn Square

The institute is located in Woburn Square, in the University of London's Bloomsbury campus in the central London Borough of Camden. Designed by Charles Holden and built in 1957, the institute's building is adjacent to Birkbeck College, School of Oriental and African Studies and Christ the King Church. It also houses the studio of the Slade School of Fine Art, University College, London.

The Warburg Institute maintains a research library of more than 350,000 volumes. These volumes, except for a relatively small proportion of rare and valuable books, are kept on open shelves and are accessible to all. The library is notable for its unusual and unique reference system: the books are arranged by subject according to Warburg's division of human history into the categories of Action, Orientation, Word, and Image. The institute also holds a large photographic collection of 450,000 photographs of paintings, sculptures, prints and drawings, arranged according to an iconographic system initiated by Rudolf Wittkower and Edgar Wind. The photographic collection also holds the valuable archive of the Image of the Black in Western Art. The institute's archive contains the personal and working papers of Aby Warburg, together with the archives of Henri Frankfort, Ernst Gombrich and other Warburgian scholars.

In 2022 work began on a major c. £14.5 million renovation and redevelopment of the existing buildings, branded "Warburg Renaissance". The project includes the creation of a new structure in the former courtyard, incorporating a lecture theatre and storage and study spaces for archives and special collections. The renovated building, which previously had restricted access, opened to the wider public in September 2024, featuring an exhibition focused on the history of the institute along with Edmund de Waal’s Library of Exile.

== Organisation ==
In addition to its primary purpose as an academic reference library, the institute accepts a small number of graduate students each year. The institute awards the degrees of Master of Arts in Cultural and Intellectual History (1300–1650) and Master of Arts in Art History, Curatorship and Renaissance culture, Master of Philosophy and Doctor of Philosophy; the first and the second are one-year degrees with taught and research components, the MPhil is a two-year research degree which would usually be expected to lead onto a PhD with further study, and the last is a three-year research degree.

The emphasis of these programmes is on developing interpretative skills in a number of different academic subjects, which follows from the institute's interdisciplinary mission. Considerable attention is devoted to improving language skills and knowledge of primary sources.

== Students and faculty ==
Scholars associated with the Warburg Institute include Ernst Cassirer, Rudolf Wittkower, Otto Kurz, Henri Frankfort, Arnaldo Momigliano, Ernst Gombrich, Erwin Panofsky, Edgar Wind, Frances Yates, Enriqueta Harris, D. P. Walker, Michael Baxandall, Jennifer Montagu, Anthony Grafton, and Elizabeth McGrath. The current group of scholars continues the institute's tradition of interdisciplinary research into history, philosophy, religion, and art. The permanent staff includes a number of academics and graduate students who hold short and long-term fellowships.

== Journal of the Warburg and Courtauld Institutes ==
Journal of the Warburg and Courtauld Institutes
- Language: English

Publication details
- Former name: Journal of the Warburg Institute
- History: 1937–present

Standard abbreviations
- ISO 4: J. Warburg Courtauld Inst.

Indexing
- ISSN: 0075-4390 (print); 2044-0014 (web)
- LCCN: 40019731
- JSTOR: jwarbcourinst
- OCLC no.: 53398409

Links
- Online access

Together with the Courtauld Institute of Art, the Warburg Institute publishes The Journal of the Warburg and Courtauld Institutes, an annual publication of about 300 pages. It was originally established as the Journal of the Warburg Institute in 1937, but changed to its current name in 1939.

== Directors ==
- 1929–1948: Fritz Saxl
- 1949–1954: Henri Frankfort
- 1954–1959: Gertrud Bing
- 1959–1976: Ernst Gombrich
- 1976–1990: J. B. Trapp
- 1990–2001: Nicholas Mann
- 2001–2010: Charles Hope
- 2010–2014: Peter Mack
- 2014–2015: Raphaële Mouren (acting)
- 2015–2017: David Freedberg
- 2017: Michelle O'Malley (acting)
- 2017– : William H Sherman

== See also ==
- Warburg Haus, Hamburg
