= Henriette Groenewegen-Frankfort =

Dutch archaeologist

- Born: 1896; Rotterdam, Netherlands
- Died: 1982 (aged 85–86); Kimmeridge, Dorset
- Education: University of Amsterdam
- Known for: 'Arrest and Movement'
- Spouse: Henri (Hans) Frankfort
- Scientific career
- Fields: Egyptian and Mesopotamian Art

Henriette Antonia "Jettie" Groenewegen-Frankfort (1896–1982) was a Dutch archaeologist and an expert on ancient art.

== Early life and education ==
Groenewegen's father was a minister and professor of philosophy of religion and ethics at the University of Amsterdam. Henriette Groenewegen attended the University of Amsterdam where she studied Greek and Chinese philosophy. There, she met her future husband Henri "Hans" Frankfort, whose studies involved history, ethnology and Chinese religion.

Groenewegen and Frankfort became engaged in 1920. As part of his studies, Frankfort studied under Flinders Petrie. Petrie brought Frankfort to Egypt to work at Qau el-Kebir. When Frankfort returned from Egypt, he and Groenwegen married. The couple spent a year in Athens at the British School at Athens from 1924 to 1925, while Frankfort was working on his PhD dissertation.

== Archaeological career ==
From 1925 to 1938, the newly married couple worked together on archaeological expeditions in the Near East. During this period Groenewegen-Frankfort became deeply involved in the study of ancient Egyptian and Mesopotamian art. From 1925-1926, Frankfort supervised expeditions funded by London's Egypt Exploration Society. Jettie worked as expedition camp manager and was considered a skilled excavator. From 1929 to 1937, the couple worked together on a yearly expedition sponsored by the University of Chicago. Their research was conducted in Iraq in the Diyala River Basin and the Assyrian city of Khorsabad.

The expedition in Iraq was halted when World War II began. Frankfort taught at the University of Chicago during the war and Jettie spent the war years 1939—1940 in Europe working with the Red Cross. In 1941, she joined her family in Chicago. In 1948, Frankfort was offered a position as director of the Warburg Institute in London and the couple returned to England.

== Selected bibliography ==
- Groenewegen-Frankfort, Henrietta A. (1987). Arrest and Movement: An Essay on Space and Time in the Representational Art of the Ancient Near East. Belkknap Press. p. 222. ISBN 978-0674046566.
- Groenewegen-Frankfort, Henrietta A.; Ashmole, Bernard (1972). Art of the Ancient World. Prentice Hall. ISBN 978-0130470010.
