= Peter Mack (academic) =

British academic (1955–2023)

Peter William David Mack FBA (16 April 1955 – 5 October 2023) was a British academic who was director of The Warburg Institute from 2010 to 2015. He succeeded Charles Hope and was succeeded by David Freedberg. He was a specialist in the history of rhetoric and was formerly professor of English at the University of Warwick.

Mack died in a traffic collision in France, on 5 October 2023, at the age of 68.

== Selected publications ==
- Renaissance Argument: Valla and Agricola in the Traditions of Rhetoric and Dialectic (Leiden, 1993)
- Elizabethan Rhetoric: Theory and Practice (Cambridge, 2002)
- A History of Renaissance Rhetoric 1380-1620 (Oxford, 2011)
