= Casa Italiana =

- U.S. National Register of Historic Places
- New York State Register of Historic Places
- New York City Landmark
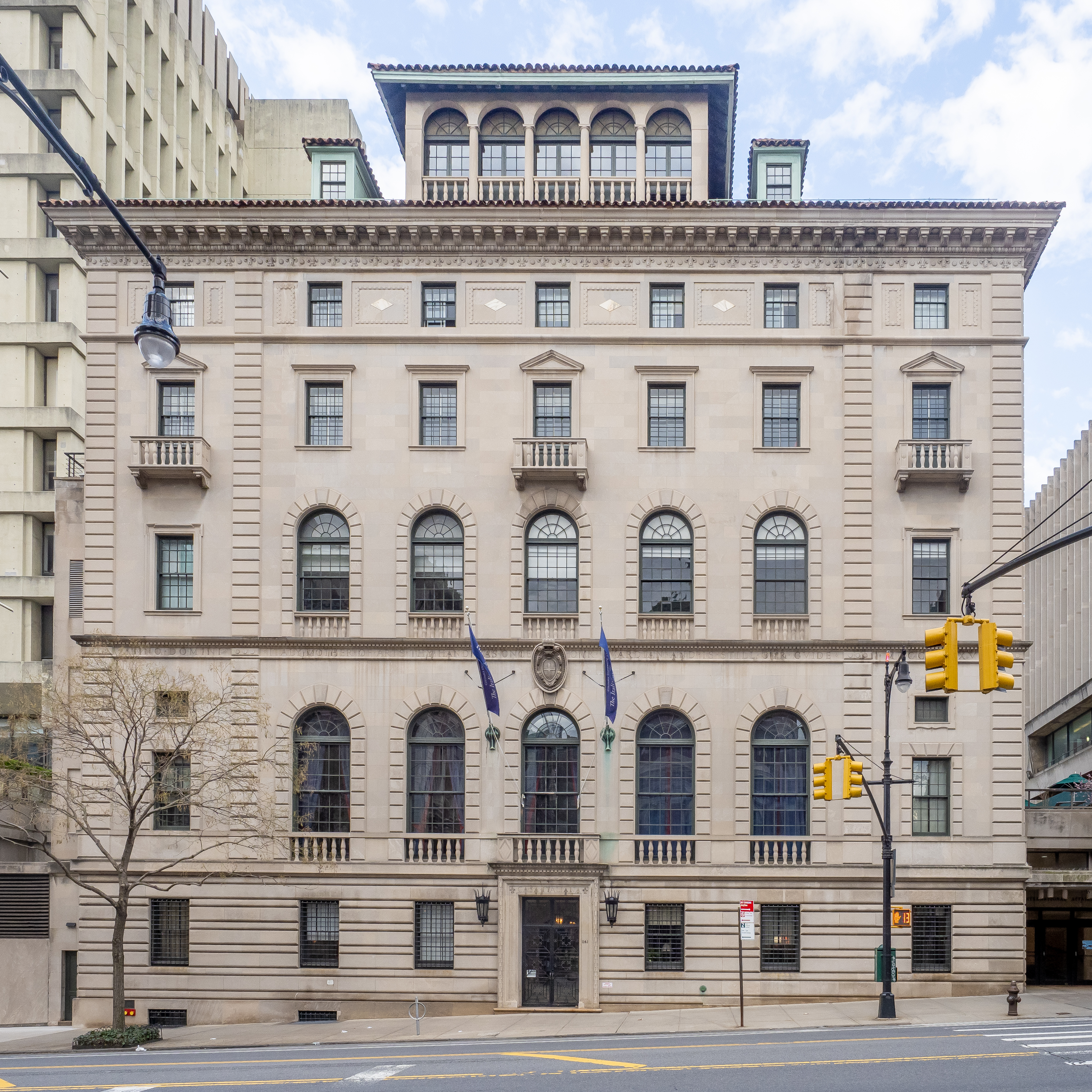
- (2022)

- Location within New York City Location within New York Location within the United States
- Location: 1151–1161 Amsterdam Ave., New York, New York
- Coordinates: 40°48′27″N 73°57′37″W
- Built: 1926–27
- Architect: William M. Kendall
- Architectural style: Italian Renaissance
- NRHP reference No.: 82001188
- NYSRHP No.: 06101.000447
- NYCL No.: 0991

Significant dates
- Added to NRHP: October 29, 1982
- Designated NYSRHP: September 22, 1982
- Designated NYCL: March 28, 1978

Casa Italiana is a building at Columbia University located at 1161 Amsterdam Avenue between West 116th and 118th Streets in the Morningside Heights neighborhood of Manhattan, New York City, which houses the university's Italian Academy for Advanced Studies in America. It was built in 1926–27 and was designed by William M. Kendall of McKim, Mead & White in the Renaissance style, modeled after a 15th-century Roman palazzo. The building was restored, and the east facade completed, in 1996 by Buttrick White & Burtis with Italo Rota as associate architect.

== History ==
In the 1920s, Italian student clubs il Circolo Italiano at Columbia and Barnard mobilized support for a Casa Italiana project. Columbia President Nicholas Murray Butler embraced the idea. The Casa campaign was led in New York by the students and by Judge John J. Freschi (who helped raise money). They reached out to New York developers Joseph Paterno, Anthony Campagna and Michael Paterno, who erected the building and covered all costs beyond contributions.

Some support came from abroad: Italy’s Fascist leader Benito Mussolini expressed enthusiasm, but he promised more than he gave. Records show only some scholarship funding from the Fascist government, and a pledge of antique furniture “to be obtained in Italy through the help of Mussolini”—but this donation never materialized, and the furnishings and artwork came instead from domestic patrons.

McKim, Mead & White, the firm responsible for the layout of Columbia's campus, created an impressive design for the Casa Italiana, modeled on the Roman palazzi of the Renaissance. When completed in 1927, it stood on the corner of Amsterdam Avenue and 117th Street, clad entirely in limestone on the west and south facades (which set it apart from all the other brick-clad buildings on campus, except for the imposing, limestone-clad Low Library). The north facade of Casa Italiana partially abutted a seven story apartment building and the east facade partially abutted a four-story brownstone (both replaced by the International Affairs building in 1970), and therefore, the exposed parts of both facades were clad in brick. The east facade, a patchwork resulting from the demolition of the brownstone, was completed in brick during Buttrick White & Burtis' 1996 restoration. The building's low-sloped roof was covered with Ludowici tiles selected to match the style common in Italy.

When the building opened in 1927, Dr. Charles Paterno generously gave 20,000 leather-bound books and funding for the Casa's library.

In 1991, the Italian Republic purchased the property for $17.5 million and leased it back to Columbia for 500 years. Renovations were undertaken, the remaining Paterno collection of books was moved to the Butler Library (many books had gone to Butler over the decades already, as the collection outgrew the Casa's Library early on), and the Italian Department was relocated from the Casa Italiana to its current home in Hamilton Hall, and The Casa building became the seat of the Italian Academy for Advanced Studies, a center for research in the humanities and sciences. A new mission was proclaimed in its Charter: “to offer a privileged vision of Europe from an Italian perspective.” Overseeing the Italian Academy is a board of guarantors, half being appointed by the university and half by the Italian government.

In 2012, a lawsuit filed by the Italic Institute, an advocacy group, in conjunction with the surviving Paterno family, claimed that Columbia had breached its responsibilities in regard to the building's use. It claimed that the University violated the donative intent of 1927 by converting the building from a cultural center opened to the students of Columbia and the seat of the Department of Italian to a restricted research facility. The New York State Supreme Court dismissed the suit for “lack of standing" and did not rule on the substance of the complaint.

Casa Italiana is one of three buildings on Columbia's campus that is designated by the New York City Landmarks Preservation Commission, having achieved that status in 1978. It was also added to the National Register of Historic Places in 1982.

== See also ==
- List of New York City Designated Landmarks in Manhattan above 110th Street
- National Register of Historic Places listings in Manhattan above 110th Street
