= Italo Rota =

Italian architect (1953–2024)

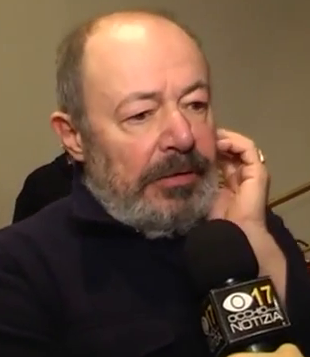
- Born: 2 October 1953; Milan, Italy
- Died: 6 April 2024 (aged 70); Milan, Italy
- Education: Politecnico di Milano
- Occupation: Architect
- Awards: Grand Prix de l’Urbanisme, Paris; Landmark Conservancy Prize, New York; Medaglia d’Oro all’Architettura Italiana
- Practice: Studio Italo Rota
- Buildings: Civic media library of Anzola dell'Emilia
- Projects: Museo del Novecento; Mobility and public spaces of the historical centre of Nantes; Casa Italiana, Columbia University

Italo Rota (2 October 1953 – 6 April 2024) was an Italian architect.

== Biography ==
Born in Milan in 1953, he obtained a degree in Architecture at Milan Polytechnic University in 1982. Before that, he had started off in the architecture firms of Franco Albini and Vittorio Gregotti. During his four-year apprenticeship with Gregotti, he worked on his project for the University of Calabria (1972–1973). He took part in the publishing of the magazine Lotus International in collaboration with architect Pierluigi Nicolin. Following this experience, the press and books became particularly important in Rota’s life, leading him to the development of a personal collection. At the beginning of the 1980s, he moved to Paris, where his two children were born, to work with Gae Aulenti on the project of the Musée d’Orsay, putting the museum at the centre of a wider concept. This experience continued in 1985, when Rota won the competition for the new rooms of the French School of the Cour Carré at the Louvre, inaugurated in 1992, and more recently, of the Museo del Novecento in Milan (2002–2010). During the twenty years he spent in France, he dealt with various aspects of design, from urban projects to layout plans for exhibitions, events, and cultural institutions. Still in France, he worked in the theatre when new Italian scenographers. In those years, Rota worked above all with director Bernard Sobel. In 1988 he designed the scenography for Hécube and, using mirrors and back lighting, recreated in a surreal manner the seats of a Greek theatre. He officially came back in Italy in 1996, moving his base from Paris to Milan, where he also served as City Councillor for urban quality (1995–1996). Rota’s studio in Milan is an integral part of his work, there he gathered objets trouvés, books, and pieces taken from various collections, from Yuri Gagarin’s helmet to masks from Central Africa, mixed up with material samples, drawings, and maquettes. Throughout his career, he has been entrusted with many projects within and without the national boundaries. Between the end of the 1990s and 2005, Rota designed the multimedia libraries in Anzola and San Sito. For Roberto Cavalli, he worked on boutiques and clubs all over the world, as well as on a villa on the hills near Florence. His works include land architecture projects, such as the renovation of the town centre of Nantes (1992–1995) and the Foro Italico promenade in Palermo (2005), and projects for buildings, such as the Boscolo Exedra Hotel in Milan, the Hindu temple of Lord Hanuman, the Ciudades de Agua pavilion for the Expo 2008 in Zaragoza, the Triennale Design Museum in 2007, as well as the above-mentioned Museo del Novecento, inaugurated in December 2010.

Rota died on 6 April 2024, at the age of 70.

== Teaching activity ==
Italo Rota was Professor of Design at the École d’Architecture UP8 Paris-Belleville (1987–1990), the Faculty of Architecture of Ferrara (1998–2000) and the IED of Milan (1996–1998). He gave seminars in various faculties and schools of architecture, such as the Columbia University, Politecnico di Milano, Lausanne Faculty of Architecture and Geneva Faculty of Architecture. Until his death, he was Director of the Design Department at the Nuova Accademia di Belle Arti in Milan and gave a workshop at IUAV on a project entitled Memory Garden.

== Awards ==
- In 1994, Grand Prix de l’Urbanisme, Paris
- In 1996, Landmark Conservancy Prize, New York
- In 2002, Premio Città di Gubbio, Gubbio
- In 2003, Medaglia d’Oro all’Architettura Italiana
- In 2006, Medaglia d’Oro all’Architettura Italiana
- In 2009, Premio di Architettura ANCE Catania
- In 2010, Primo Premio del Marble Architectural Awards 2010 nella categoria “Interni”
- In 2011, Premio Internazionale Ischia di Architettura (PIDA)
