= Henri Frankfort =

Dutch archaeologist and historian

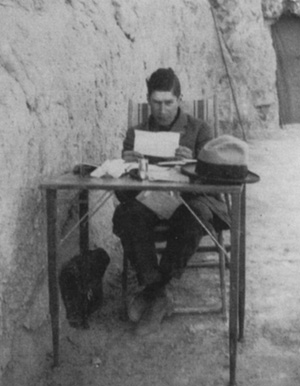
- Frankfort in the 1930s
- Born: 24 February 1897; Amsterdam, Netherlands
- Died: 16 July 1954 (aged 57); London, England
- Spouse: Henriette Groenewegen-Frankfort

Academic background
- Education: University of Amsterdam; University College London; University of Leiden

Academic work
- Institutions: Oriental Institute; University of Chicago; Warburg Institute

Henri "Hans" Frankfort (24 February 1897 – 16 July 1954) was a Dutch Egyptologist, archaeologist and orientalist.

== Early life and education ==
Born in Amsterdam, into a "liberal Jewish" family, Frankfort studied history at the University of Amsterdam and then moved to London, where in 1924, he took an MA under Sir Flinders Petrie at the University College. In 1927 he gained a Ph.D. from the University of Leiden.

== Career ==
Between 1925 and 1929, Frankfort was the director of the excavations of the Egypt Exploration Society (EES) of London at El-Amarna, Abydos and Armant. In 1929 he was invited by Henry Breasted to become field director of the Oriental Institute (OI) of the Chicago expedition to Iraq.

In 1931 he became correspondent of the Royal Netherlands Academy of Arts and Sciences, later resigning in late 1944. He became foreign member in 1950.

In 1937 Frankfort and Emil Kraeling identified a woman on the Burney Relief (c 1700BCE) as Lilith of later Jewish mythology, though this identification is now generally rejected.

In 1939 he published what Gary Beckman considers to be perhaps his most influential scholarly achievement Cylinder Seals: A Documentary Essay on the Art and Religion of the Ancient Near East. In a collaborative work with Henriette Groenewegen-Frankfort, John A. Wilson, and Thorkild Jacobsen he published The Intellectual Adventure of Ancient Man in 1946, an influential work on the nature of myth and reality. Frankfort published Kingship and the Gods in 1948, "a classic work" in the opinion of John Baines. In 1948 he became director of the Warburg Institute in London. He was elected to the American Philosophical Society in 1948. Along with EA Wallis Budge, he was revolutionary for his time for suggesting that Egyptian civilization, culturally, religiously, and ethnically arose from an African, instead of an Asian base. He wrote 15 books and monographs and about 73 articles for journals about ancient Egypt, archaeology and cultural anthropology, especially on the religious systems of the Ancient Near East.

Erik Hornung in his influential work Conceptions of God in Ancient Egypt, The One and the Many acknowledged his debt to previous work done by Henri Frankfort.

He died in London.

== Personal life ==
He married Henriette Groenewegen-Frankfort and later Enriqueta Harris.

== Bibliography ==
- The Mural Painting of el-Amarna (1929)
- The Cenotaph of Seti I at Abydos (together with A. de Buck and B. Gunn, 1933)
- The City of Akhenaten volume II (together with J. D. S. Pendlebury, 1933)
- Cylinder Seals: A Documentary Essay on Ihe Art and Religion of the Ancient Near East (1939)
- The Intellectual Adventure of Ancient Man (1946) (later retitled Before Philosophy)
- Ancient Egyptian Religion: an Interpretation (1948)
- Kingship and the Gods. A Study of Ancient Near Eastern Religion as the Integration of Society and Nature (1948)
- The Birth of Civilization in the Near East (1951)
- The Art and Architecture of the Ancient Orient (1954)
