= Elizabeth Barlow Rogers =

American architect

Elizabeth Barlow Rogers (born 1936) is an American environmentalist, landscape preservationist, author of numerous books and essays, and a former park administrator. Her most notable achievement was her role in the revitalization of New York City's Central Park in the 1980s and 1990s. In 1980, Rogers helped found the Central Park Conservancy, a not-for-profit corporation formed to organize private sector support for the restoration and renewed management of the park. She served as the Conservancy's first president from its founding until 1995.

== Early life and education ==
Elizabeth "Betsy" Browning was born in San Antonio, Texas to Caleb Leonidas Browning (1902–1970), a general contractor and cattle rancher, and his wife, Elizabeth (Ewing) Browning (1904–1992). She grew up in Alamo Heights and prepared for college at Saint Mary's Hall. In 1952, she enrolled at Wellesley College, where she majored in art history (BA 1957), and in the summer following her graduation married Edward L. Barlow, a graduate of Lawrenceville and Yale (BA 1956). They lived in Washington DC, where he was a naval officer stationed at the Pentagon, but in 1960 returned to Yale where he studied law (LLB 1964) and she studied urban planning (MA 1964). After completion of their studies, they moved to New York City.

== Career ==
=== Central Park ===
In 1979, Mayor Ed Koch appointed Rogers to the newly created position of Central Park Administrator. At the time, the 843-acre (341 ha) public space was strewn with trash and long neglected with virtually no funding allocated to improving its condition. Working with then NYC Parks commissioner Gordon J. Davis, Rogers conceived of a master plan to reinstate the Greensward Plan design by Frederick Law Olmsted and Calvert Vaux, while also keeping in mind the public purpose of the greensward and practical considerations. Rogers' aim was "the renewal of the physical beauty of the park as originally envisioned by Frederick Law Olmsted and Calvert Vaux, yet integrated with contemporary social and recreational uses."

Rogers recruited friends and volunteers to assist her in reclaiming discrete sections of the park. One of these colleagues was Lynden Miller. In 1982, Rogers asked Miller to tackle Central Park's Conservatory Garden.

=== Cityscape Institute ===
In 1995, Rogers founded the Cityscape Institute with a mission to improve the design of the entourage of New York City's sidewalks: the benches, telephone booths, trash cans, street lights, traffic signs, and stop lights. The institute was unable to accomplish its goals, however, for unlike Central Park, where Rogers had managerial authority and widespread public support, the city's streetscape was the subject of, in Rogers's words, "general indifference to the visual blight that has grown with the progressive coarsening of the environment as it has been allowed to become dominated by highway engineers and commercial interests." According to one newspaper reporter, who interviewed Rogers in 2001,

Cityscape has made only fitful progress in achieving its goal, as Ms. Rogers concedes. The institute and its founder have become mired in dozens of messy battles with city bureaucrats over designs for light poles, plans to reroute traffic and other issues.

The institute formally ceased operating in 2006.

=== Bard Graduate Center ===
In 2001, Rogers set up a program in garden history and landscape studies at the Bard Graduate Center, New York, and directed it until 2005.

=== Foundation for Landscape Studies ===
In 2005, Rogers established the Foundation for Landscape Studies, whose mission was, according to its website, "to foster an active understanding of the importance of place in human life." Among its activities was the publication of thirty-five issues of the biannual journal Site/Lines, edited by Rogers. The foundation ceased operating in 2021.

== Bibliography ==
=== Books ===
- Elizabeth Barlow (author); Rene Dubos (foreword). The Forests and Wetlands of New York City (Boston: Little, Brown and Co., 1971), a recipient of the John Burroughs Medal and nominated for the National Book Award.
- Jason Epstein and Elizabeth Barlow. East Hampton: A History and Guide (Sag Harbor, NY: Medway Press, 1975).
- Elizabeth Barlow, with Vernon Gray, Roger Pasquier, and Lewis Sharp. The Central Park Book (New York: Central Park Task Force, 1977).
- Elizabeth Barlow Rogers (principal author) with Marianne Cramer, Judith L. Heintz, Bruce Kelly, Philip N. Winslow, and John Berendt (editor). Rebuilding Central Park: A Management and Restoration Tool (Cambridge, MA: MIT Press, 1987).
- Elizabeth Barlow Rogers. Landscape Design: A Cultural and Architectural History (New York: Harry N. Abrams, 2001).
- Elizabeth Barlow Rogers. Learning Las Vegas: Portrait of a Northern New Mexican Place (Santa Fe, NM: Museum of New Mexico Press, 2013).
- Elizabeth Barlow Rogers (author); Tony Hiss (preface). Green Metropolis: the Extraordinary Landscapes of New York City as Nature, History, and Design (New York: Alfred A. Knoph, 2016).
- Elizabeth Barlow Rogers. Saving Central Park: A History and a Memoir (New York: Alfred A. Knoph, 2018).
- Elizabeth Barlow Rogers. Writing the City: Essays on New York (Amherst, MA: Library of American Landscape History, 2022.

=== Exhibition catalogues ===
- Elizabeth Barlow (essay); William Alex (illustrative portfolio). Frederick Law Olmsted's New York (New York: Praeger, 1972). The book accompanied an exhibition (from October 19 to December 3, 1972) at the Whitney Museum of American Art.
- Elizabeth Barlow Rogers (essay), Elizabeth S. Eustis (contributor), John Bidwell (contributor). Romantic Gardens: Nature, Art and Landscape Design (New York: David R. Godine, 2010). The book accompanied an exhibition (from May 21 through September 5, 2010) at the Morgan Library & Museum in New York City.

=== Writing in journals (partial list) ===
- Elizabeth Barlow. "Keeping Jamaica Bay for the Birds," New York, Vol. 2, No. 49 (December 8, 1969), pp. 58–62.
- Elizabeth Barlow. "The New York Environmental Teach-in," New York, Vol. 3, No. 13 (March 30, 1970), p. 24.
- Elizabeth Barlow. "Cut the Garbage," New York, Vol. 4, No. 3 (January 18, 1971), pp. 40–42.
- Elizabeth Barlow. "New York: A Once and Future Arcadia," New York, Vol. 4, No. 48 (November 29, 1971), p. 50.
- Elizabeth Barlow. "The Hudson River: Then and Now," New York, Vol. 5, No. 22 (May 29, 1972), pp. 38–48.
- Elizabeth Barlow. "The City Politic: The Battle for Southampton," New York, Vol. 6, No. 39 (September 24, 1973) pp. 10–11.
- Elizabeth Barlow. "The City Politic: A Little Less Night Music, Please," New York, Vol. 8, No. 9 (March 3, 1975) pp. 7–8.
- Elizabeth Barlow. "Page of Lists: The Desert Isles of New York," New York, Vol. 11, No. 41 (October 9, 1978), p. 9.
- Elizabeth Barlow Rogers. "The Landscapes of Robert Moses," Site/Lines, Vol. 3, No. 1 (Fall 2007). pp. 3–18.
- Elizabeth Barlow Rogers. "Time and Place: Deep Thoughts on a Journey Down the Colorado River," Site/Lines, Vol. 10, No. 2 (Spring 2015). pp. 3–6.
- Elizabeth Barlow Rogers. "Olmsted as author," The New Criterion, Vol. 34, No. 7 (March 2016), p. 13.
- Elizabeth Barlow Rogers. "Home on the Range: A Texas Childhood," Site/Lines, Vol. 14, No. 1 (Fall 2018). pp. 3–5.

== Awards and honors ==
- Wellesley College: Alumnae Achievement Award, 1989.
- The American Society of Landscape Architects: LaGasse Medal, 2005.
- The National Audubon Society: The Rachel Carson Award (recognizing female environmental leaders), 2008, awarded jointly to Rogers, Jean Clark, Norma Dana, Marguerite Purnell, and Phyllis Wagner, who were among the founders of the Central Park Conservancy.
- The Rockefeller Foundation: Jane Jacobs Medal for Lifetime Leadership, 2010. Rogers donated the $80,000 prize to the Foundation for Landscape Studies.
- Green-Wood Historic Fund: DeWitt Clinton Award for Excellence (in the arts, literature, preservation, and historic research), 2010.
- University of Notre Dame: Henry Hope Reed Award, 2012.
- Preservation League of New York State: Pillar of New York Award, 2013.
- New York Botanical Garden: Gold Medal, 2016.
- Central Park, New York City: A bronze plaque on a boulder on the slope above the Diana Ross Playground in honor of her service to the park.

== Personal life ==
In July 1957, Rogers married Edward L. Barlow, with whom she had two children, Lisa Barlow Tobin, a photographer and David Barlow, an actor. They divorced in 1979. In 1984, she married Theodore C. Rogers.
