= Eleanor Roosevelt Monument =

Sculpture in Manhattan, New York, U.S.

Coordinates: 40°46′50″N 73°59′09″W

The bronze statue, granite boulder and footstone, sculpted by Penelope Jencks

The Eleanor Roosevelt Monument is located at the southeast corner of New York City's Riverside Park. It was the first work of public art in New York City to be dedicated to an American woman and, according to the Eleanor Roosevelt Monument Fund, which provided much of the funding for the project, it was the first work of public art to be dedicated to an American president's wife. The centerpiece of the monument is a bronze statue of Eleanor Roosevelt. Hillary Clinton (the first lady at the time) gave the keynote address at the monument's dedication on October 5, 1996.

== Design ==
The landscape architects Bruce Kelly and David Varnell designed a circular, elevated bed planted with oak trees as a setting for a bronze statue of Roosevelt leaning against a granite boulder, both sculpted by Penelope Jencks. The architect Michael Dwyer designed two granite medallions, set into the surrounding bluestone paving (one inscribed with a quotation from a 1958 speech of Roosevelt's; the other with a quotation from Adlai Stevenson's 1962 eulogy for her), and a bronze plaque in the tree bed, summarizing her many achievements.

Jencks, who was chosen by a nationwide competition, took four years to complete the work. Douglas Martin, reporting for The New York Times in 1995, wrote that she took so long because she "was determined to do everything just so." According to Martin,

The first step was finding the rock for Mrs. Roosevelt to lean on, a key feature of Ms. Jencks's award-winning design. That took months before she realized she would have to create the shape of the rock herself. Then, she fought to get the proportions of the body right, doing copious geometrical calculations. Solutions came more easily when she found the perfect model, at least for the upper body. (Other models were used for other parts.) It was Phoebe Roosevelt, Mrs. Roosevelt's great-granddaughter, who is 5 feet 11 inches tall, an inch shorter than Mrs. Roosevelt.

== Gallery ==
The Eleanor Roosevelt Monument designed by landscape architects Bruce Kelly & David Varnell.

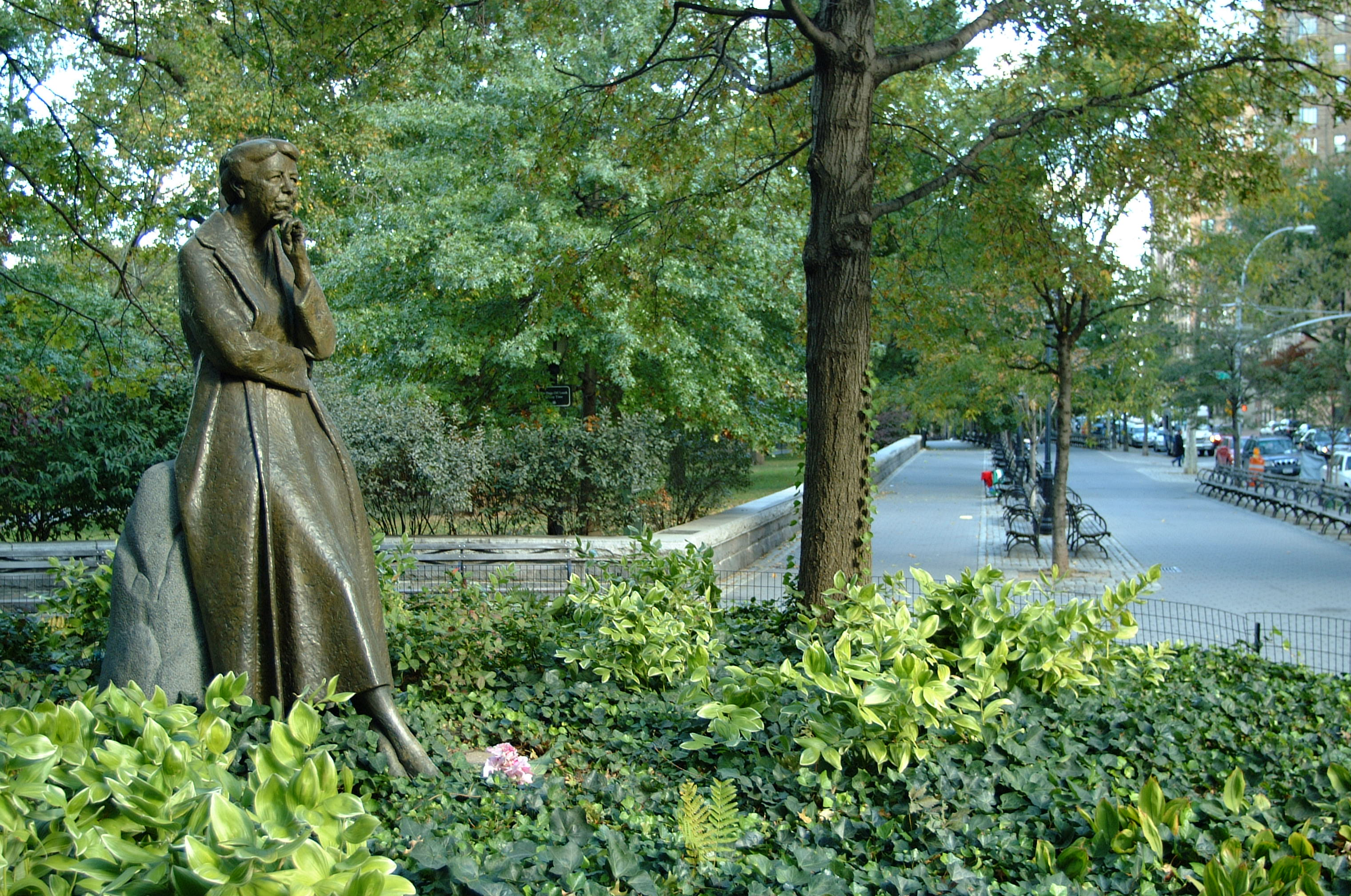
The bronze statue of Eleanor Roosevelt seen from the south.

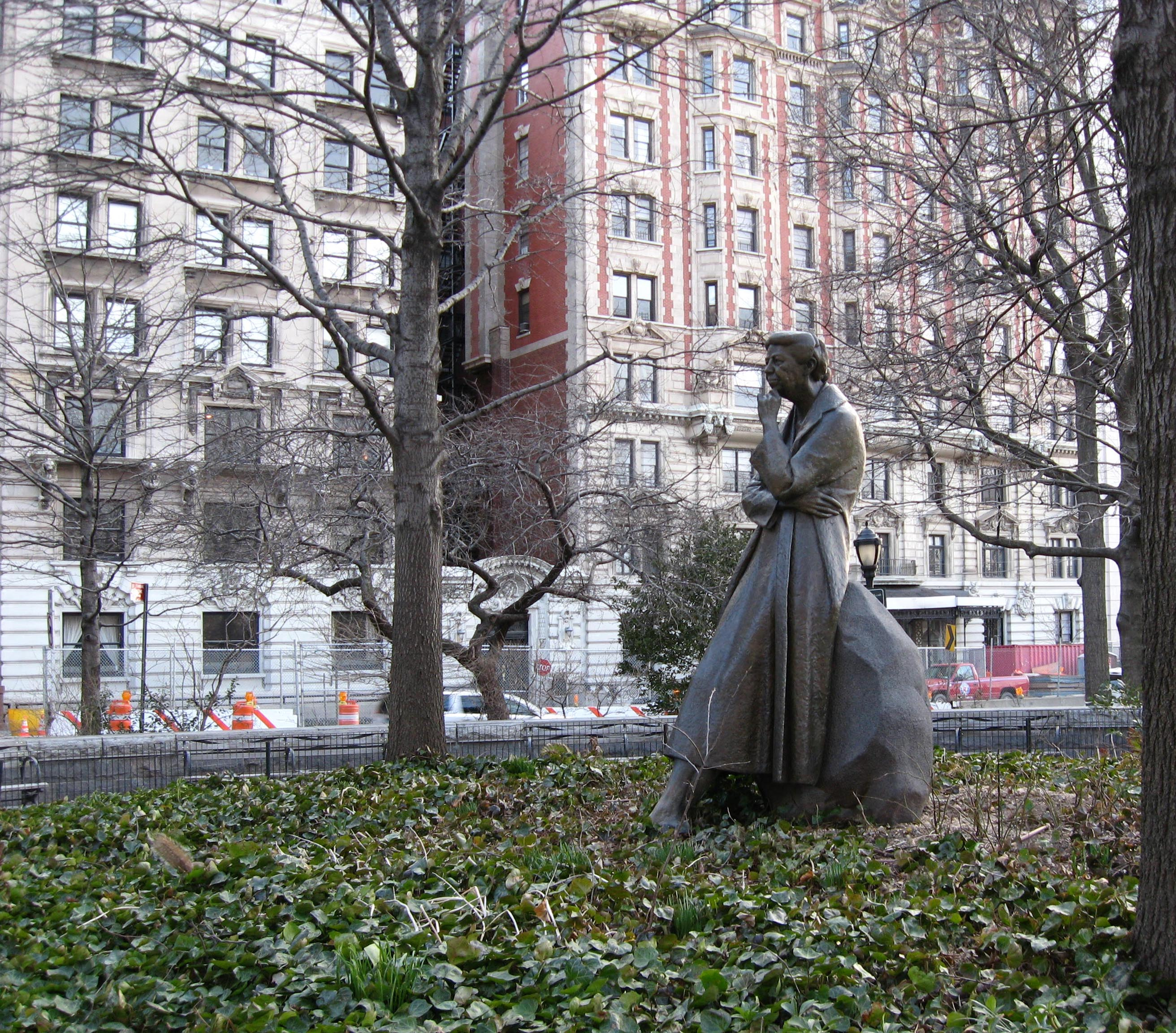
The statue of Eleanor Roosevelt seen from the northeast.

The statue of Eleanor Roosevelt seen from the northwest.

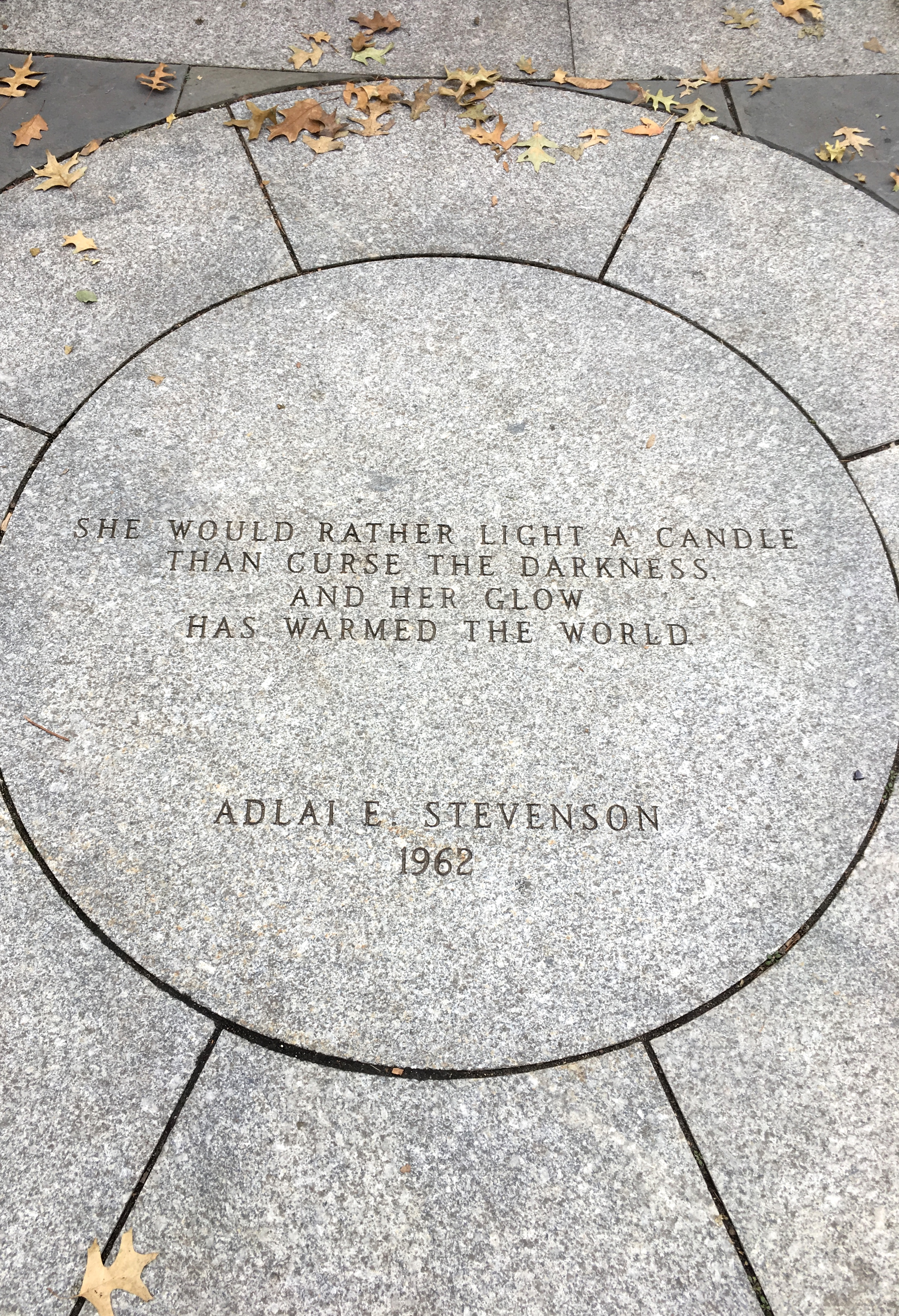
Granite medallion inscribed with Adlai Stevenson's quote, designed by Michael Dwyer.

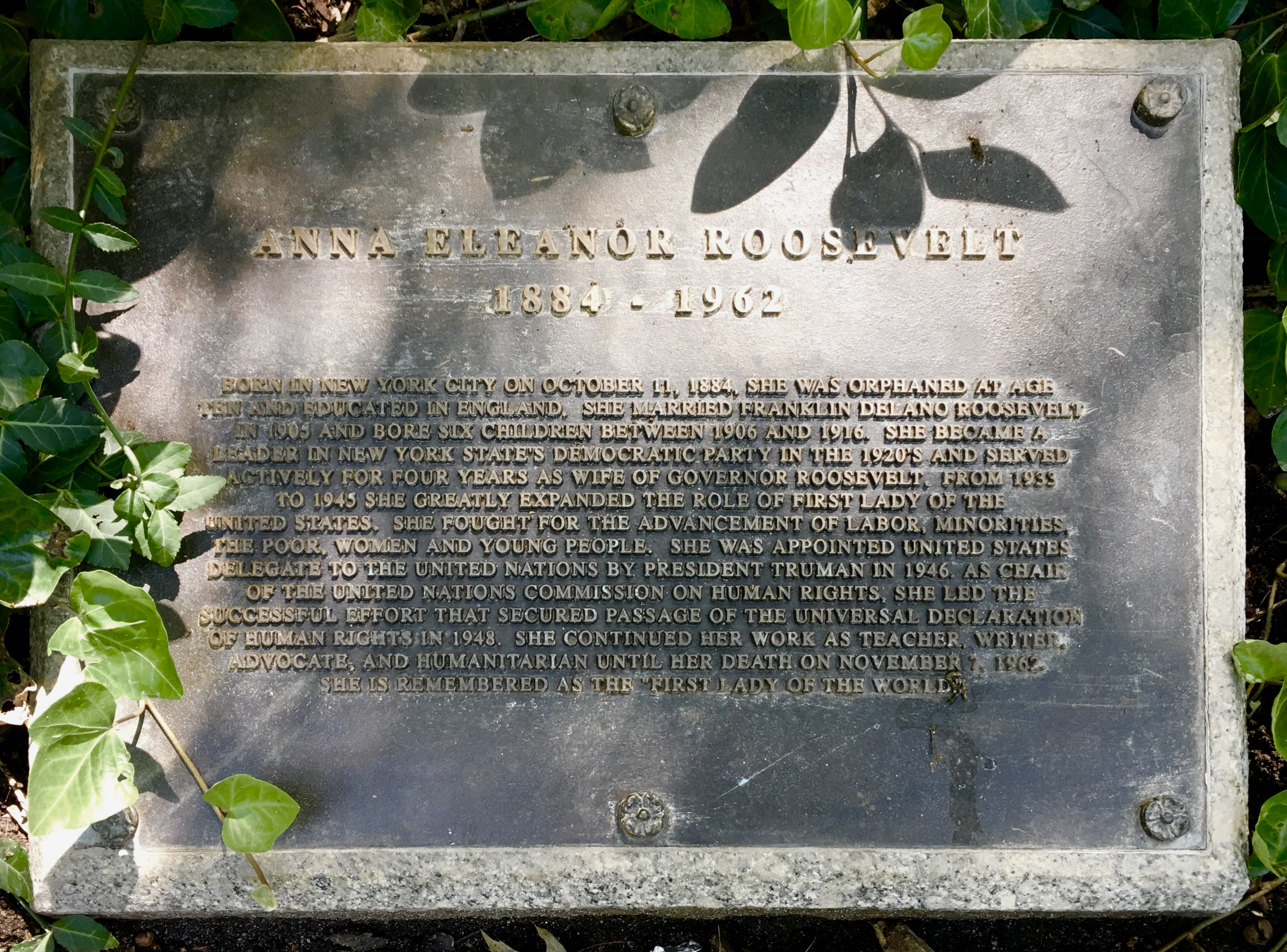
Eleanor Roosevelt Biographical Plaque, designed by Michael Dwyer.
