= Bruce Kelly =

Landscape architect based in New York City, USA

Bruce R. Kelly (December 8, 1948 – January 21, 1993) was a landscape architect based in New York City, an advocate for the preservation and restoration of landscapes designed by Frederick Law Olmsted. He is also remembered for his own designs in New York's parks, which include Strawberry Fields, the memorial to John Lennon in New York's Central Park.

== Early life, education and career ==
Bruce Kelly was born in 1948 in Montgomery, Alabama. His family lived in Titus, Alabama, but a few years after his birth, moved to Wrens, Georgia where Kelly grew up. In 1971, he received a bachelor's degree in landscape architecture from the University of Georgia and in 1973, received a master's degree in historic preservation from Columbia University. From July to September 1974, Kelly was in Tuscany preparing archaeological drawings of the ancient Roman town of Cosa, excavated under the auspices of the American Academy in Rome. After returning to New York, he worked from 1974 to 1977 for the Central Park Task Force, formed to help rehabilitate Central Park.

In May 1977, Kelly formed Bruce Kelly Associates. An early client, the Central Park Conservancy, engaged him to help compile an inventory of the park's natural assets, the first done in decades. Completed between 1982 and 1985, the exercise led to the creation of the Conservancy's master plan for the subsequent restoration of the park (published in 1987 as Rebuilding Central Park: A Management and Restoration Tool). In October 1981, Kelly and Gail Guillet organized an exhibit at the Metropolitan Museum of Art entitled "Art of the Olmsted Landscape." The exhibit and the accompanying catalogue helped cement Kelly's reputation as an Olmsted expert. That same month, Kelly obtained his license to practice landscape architecture in New York State.

In March 1986, Kelly formed a partnership with David Varnell, a classmate from the University of Georgia, where in 1971 they jointly published their senior thesis, a planning study for Washington, Georgia. Kelly and Varnell were well known for their many master plans and projects for public spaces, but on a parallel track they cultivated a private practice. Writing in 1988, James Baily noted that Kelly was active "...in the most rarefied strata of the private sector, undertaking elaborate garden projects for such clients as Mary Morgan, Carolyne Roehm and Henry Kravis, Yoko Ono, Saul and Gayfryd Steinberg, and some dozen others. These are good times to be Bruce Kelly." Other glamorous commissions included the garden of Angier Biddle Duke in Southampton, New York, that of Ashton Hawkins on the Greek island of Patmos and the restoration of the gardens of the Pallazo Abrizzi in Venice.

Kelly died in 1993 at the age of 44, after which David Varnell continued the practice, completing (among other projects) the Eleanor Roosevelt Monument in New York's Riverside Park, dedicated in October 1996. In 2000, the firm changed its name to Kelly Varnell Virgona.

== Representative works of Kelly/Varnell ==
- Master Plan for the Arboretum, South Park, Buffalo, New York (1985).
- Strawberry Fields, Central Park, New York City (dedicated 1985).
- Master Plan, Boulevard East Promenade, Weehauken, New Jersey (1985).
- James Michael Levin Playground, Central Park, New York City (1987).
- Restoration of the Dene, Central Park, New York City (1987).
- Garden Design, Metropolitan Home Magazine Show House (to benefit DIFFA), 126 East 65th St., New York City (1988).
- Restoration of the Shakespeare Garden in Central Park, New York City (begun 1987; dedicated 1989).
- Forest Park Redevelopment Proposal, Forest Park, St. Louis, Missouri (June 1989).
- Perennial Garden, Rusk Institute of Rehabilitation Medicine, New York City (1991).
- Specifications for Landscape Restoration and Construction (1993), The Hermitage, Ho-Ho-Kus, New Jersey,
- Renovation of the Boulevard East Promenade and ancillary parks, Weehawken, New Jersey (1989–1995).
- Eleanor Roosevelt Monument, Riverside Park, New York City (dedicated October 5, 1996; Penelope Jencks, sculptor of bronze statue and stone boulder; Michael Dwyer, bronze plaques, granite medallions, and inscriptions).

== Gallery ==
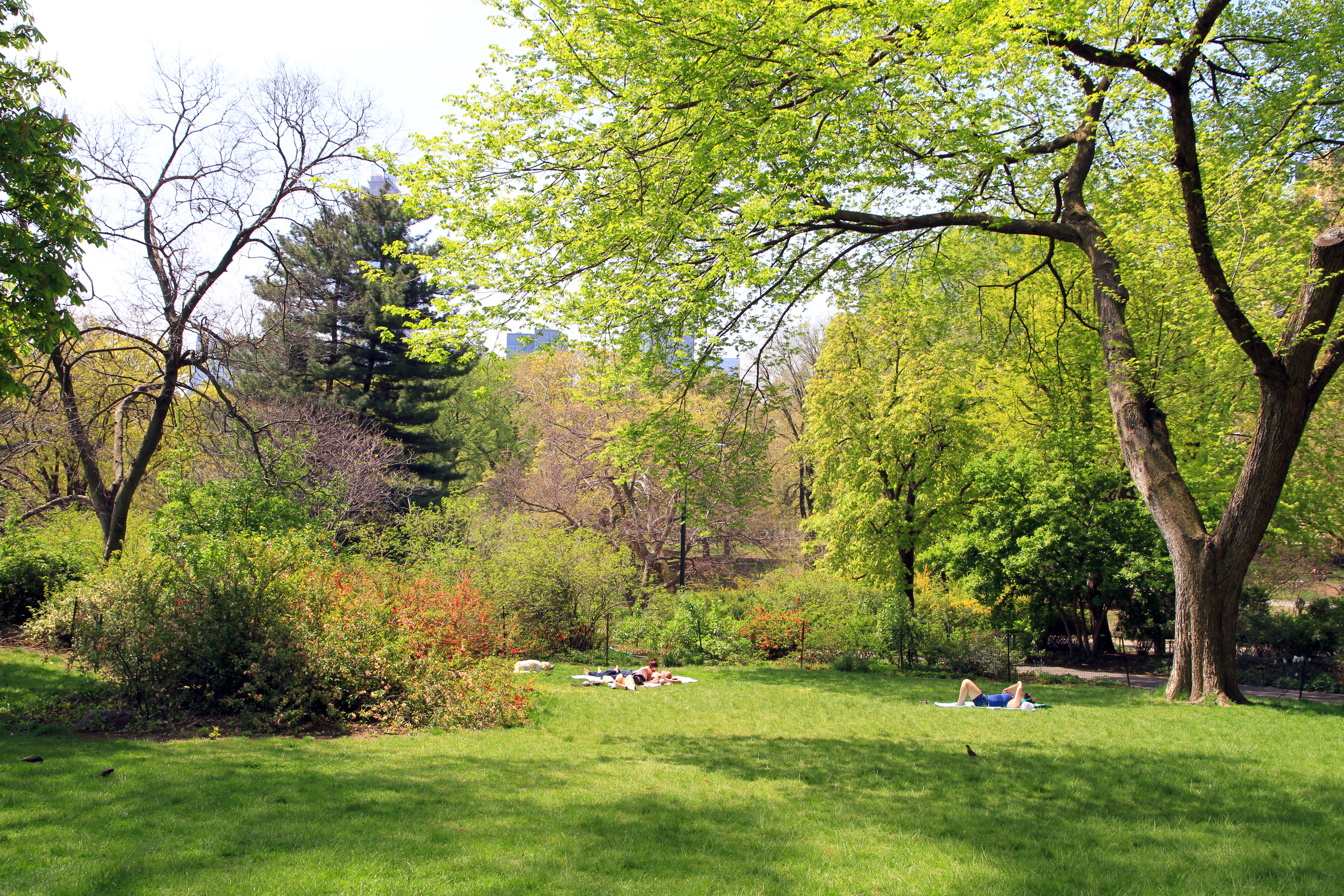
A view of the landscape of Strawberry Fields.

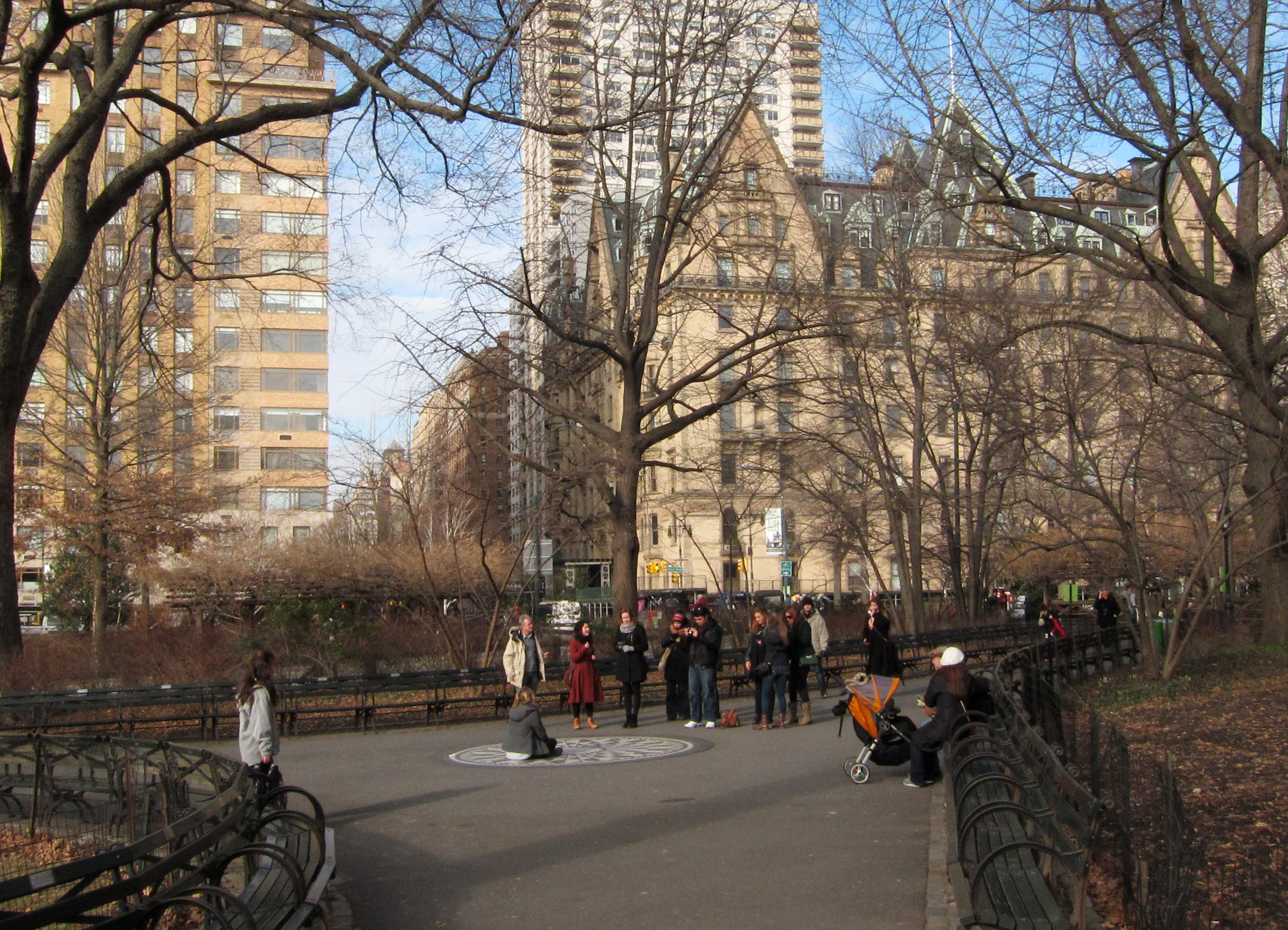
The memorial at Strawberry Fields, New York City, dedicated October 1985.

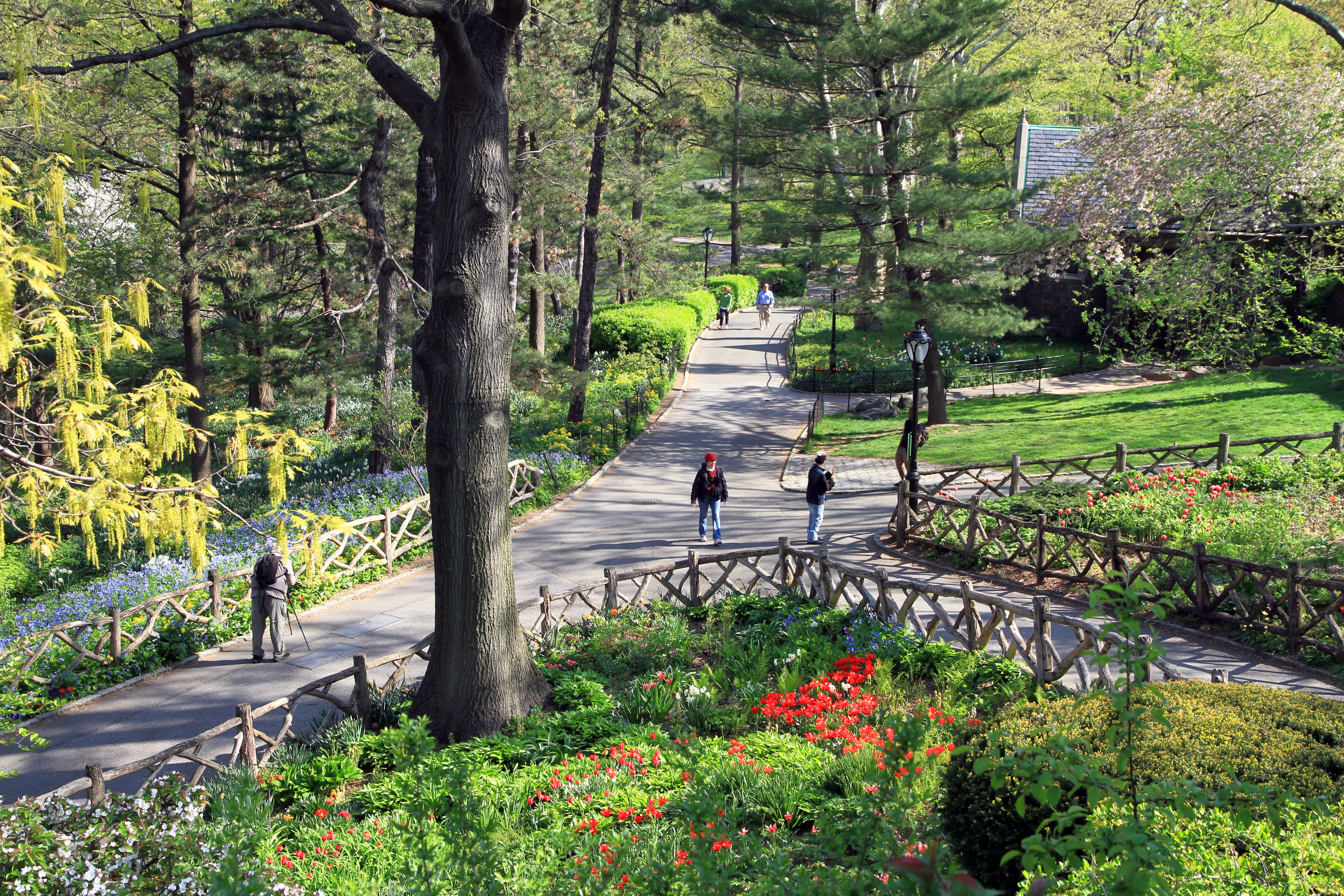
The Shakespeare Garden in Central Park, dedicated on June 2, 1989.

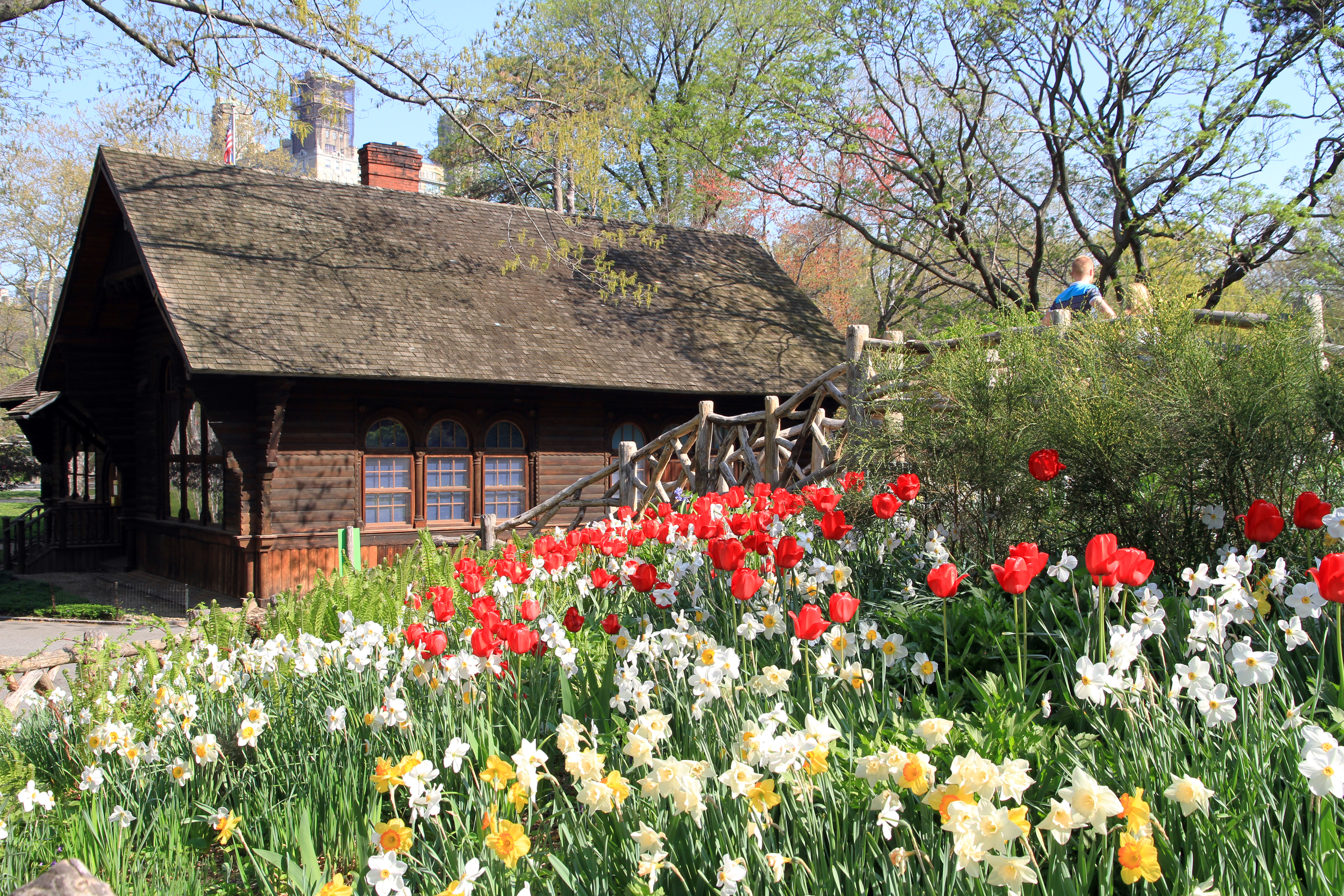
The Shakespeare Garden in Central Park.

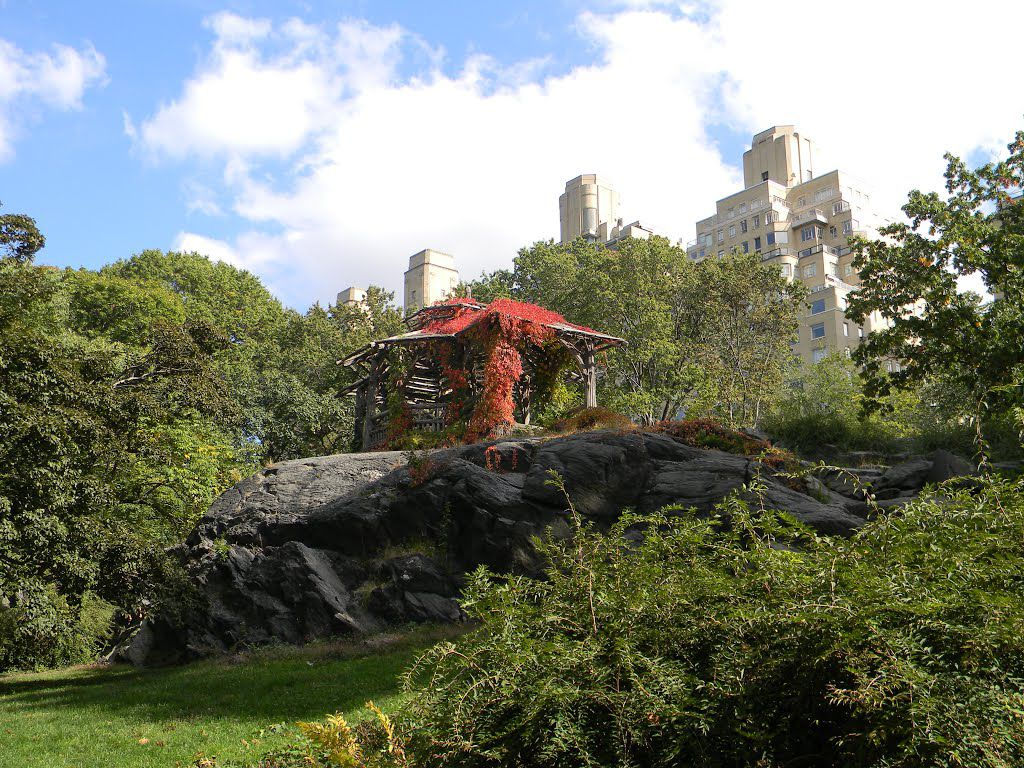
The Dene and Summerhouse, Central Park.

Eleanor Roosevelt Monument, New York City, dedicated October 1996.

== Written works ==
- Bruce Kelly, Gail Travis Guillet and Mary Ellen W. Hern. Art of the Olmsted Landscape (New York: NYC Landmarks Preservation Commission and The Arts Publisher, 1981).
- Elizabeth Barlow Rogers (principal author) with Marianne Cramer, Judith L. Heintz, Bruce Kelly, Philip N. Winslow, and John Berendt (editor). Rebuilding Central Park: A Management and Restoration Tool (Cambridge, Massachusetts: MIT Press, 1987).
