= Penelope Jencks =

American sculptor

- Born: 1936 (age 89–90); Baltimore, Maryland, U.S.
- Education: Boston University (BFA)
- Occupation: Sculptor
- Notable work: Eleanor Roosevelt Monument

Penelope Jencks (born 1936 in Baltimore, Maryland, USA) is an American sculptor and a graduate of Boston University (BFA, 1958). Her public works include a statue of the historian Samuel Eliot Morison (1982) on Commonwealth Avenue in Boston, Massachusetts; a statue of Eleanor Roosevelt (1996) in New York City's Riverside Park; and a statue of Robert Frost (2007) at Amherst College, Amherst, Massachusetts.

A common characteristic of all three works is the geological character of the base, in the form of sculpted rocks and boulders, supporting the bronze figure.

== Eleanor Roosevelt Monument ==
The Eleanor Roosevelt Monument, located in New York City's Riverside Park, is said to be the first monument dedicated to an American president's wife. Hillary Clinton (First Lady at the time) gave the keynote address at the monument's October 1996 dedication.

The statue, the boulder on which it leans, and the foot stone on which it rests, all sculpted by Jencks, form the centerpiece of a heavily planted circular memorial designed by the landscape architects Bruce Kelly and David Varnell. The architect Michael Dwyer designed two inscribed granite medallions set into the surrounding bluestone paving, including one with a quotation from Roosevelt's 1958 speech at the United Nations advocating universal human rights, and a bronze tablet, located in the planting bed, summarizing her many achievements.

== Gallery ==
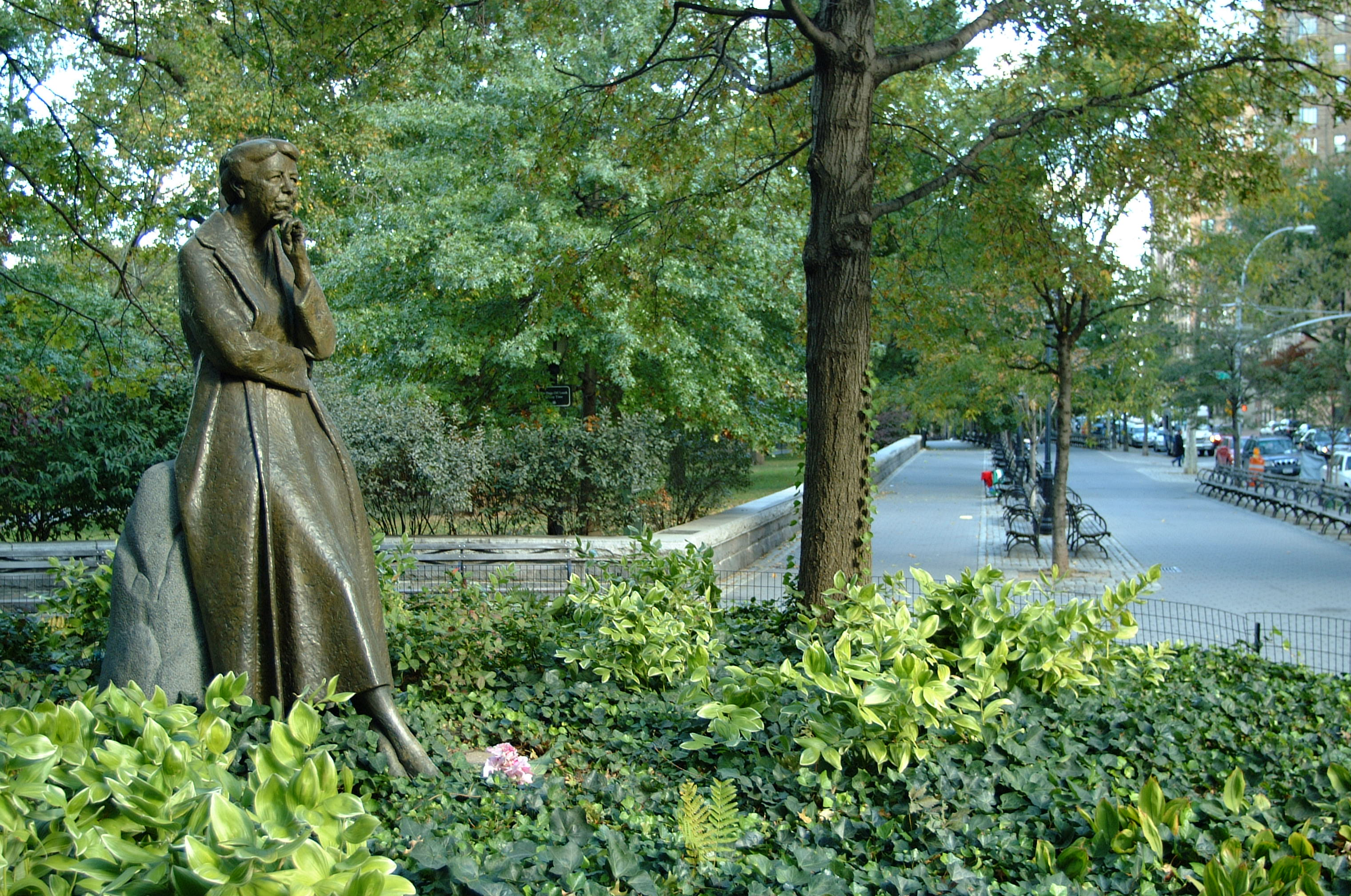
Penelope Jencks's statue of Eleanor Roosevelt seen from the south.

The statue of Eleanor Roosevelt, the boulder, and the footstone, sculpted by Penelope Jencks.

Eleanor Roosevelt Biographical Plaque, designed by Michael Dwyer.

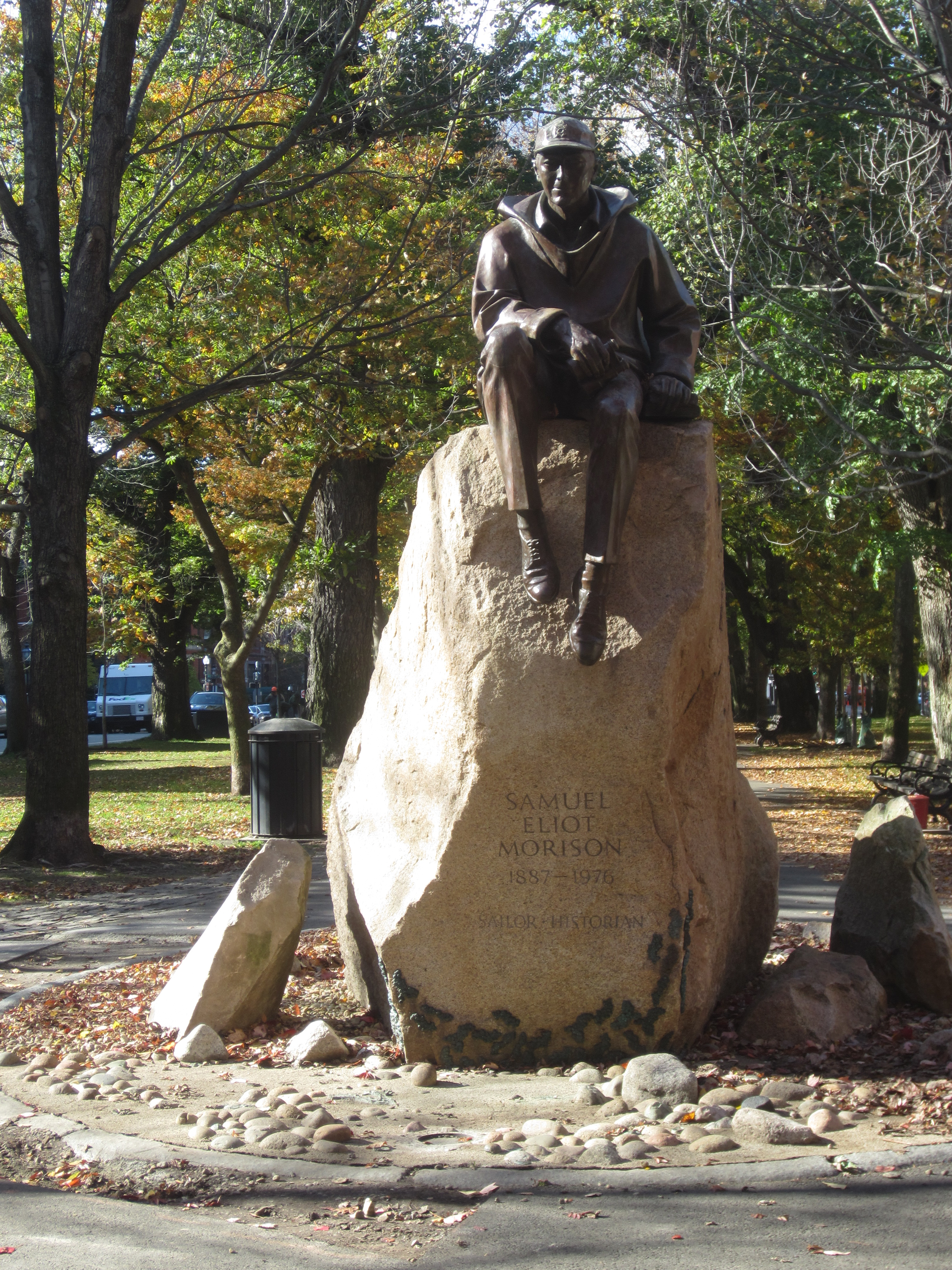
Statue of Samuel Eliot Morison.

Statue of poet Robert Frost, sculpted by Penelope Jencks, and installed at Amherst College in Amherst, Massachusetts.
