= Michael Dwyer (architect) =

American architect

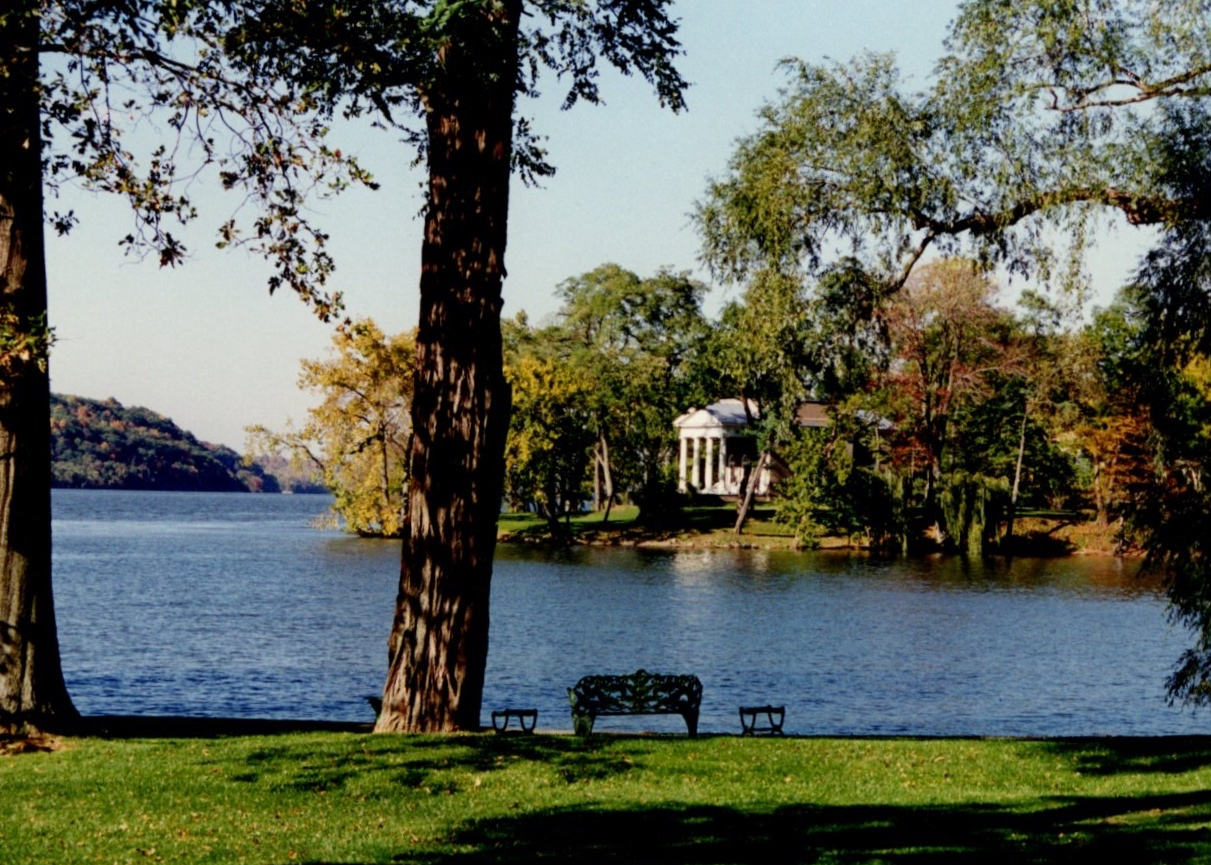
- Classical pavilion on the Hudson River at Edgewater in Barrytown, New York.
- Born: 1954 (age 71–72); Philadelphia, PA.
- Education: Rose Bay Secondary College, Sydney, NSW.; Columbia College (B.A.); University of Pennsylvania (M.Architecture)
- Occupation: Architect
- Buildings: Pavilions at Edgewater, Barrytown, NY.; Hollyhock (residence), Southampton, NY.; Eleanor Roosevelt Monument, Riverside Park, New York City.

Michael Dwyer is an American architect, and the author of books about architecture, including Great Houses of the Hudson River (2001), and Carolands (2006).

== Buttrick White & Burtis Architects ==
=== St. Thomas Choir School ===
Michael Dwyer was associated from 1981 to 1995 with the New York architecture firm Buttrick White & Burtis, where he helped design several noteworthy buildings, among them the Saint Thomas Choir School, a fifteen-story boarding school in Midtown Manhattan, completed in 1987. Writing in The New York Times, architecture critic Paul Goldberger placed the school "among the city's best examples of contextual architecture."

=== Dana Discovery Center in New York's Central Park ===
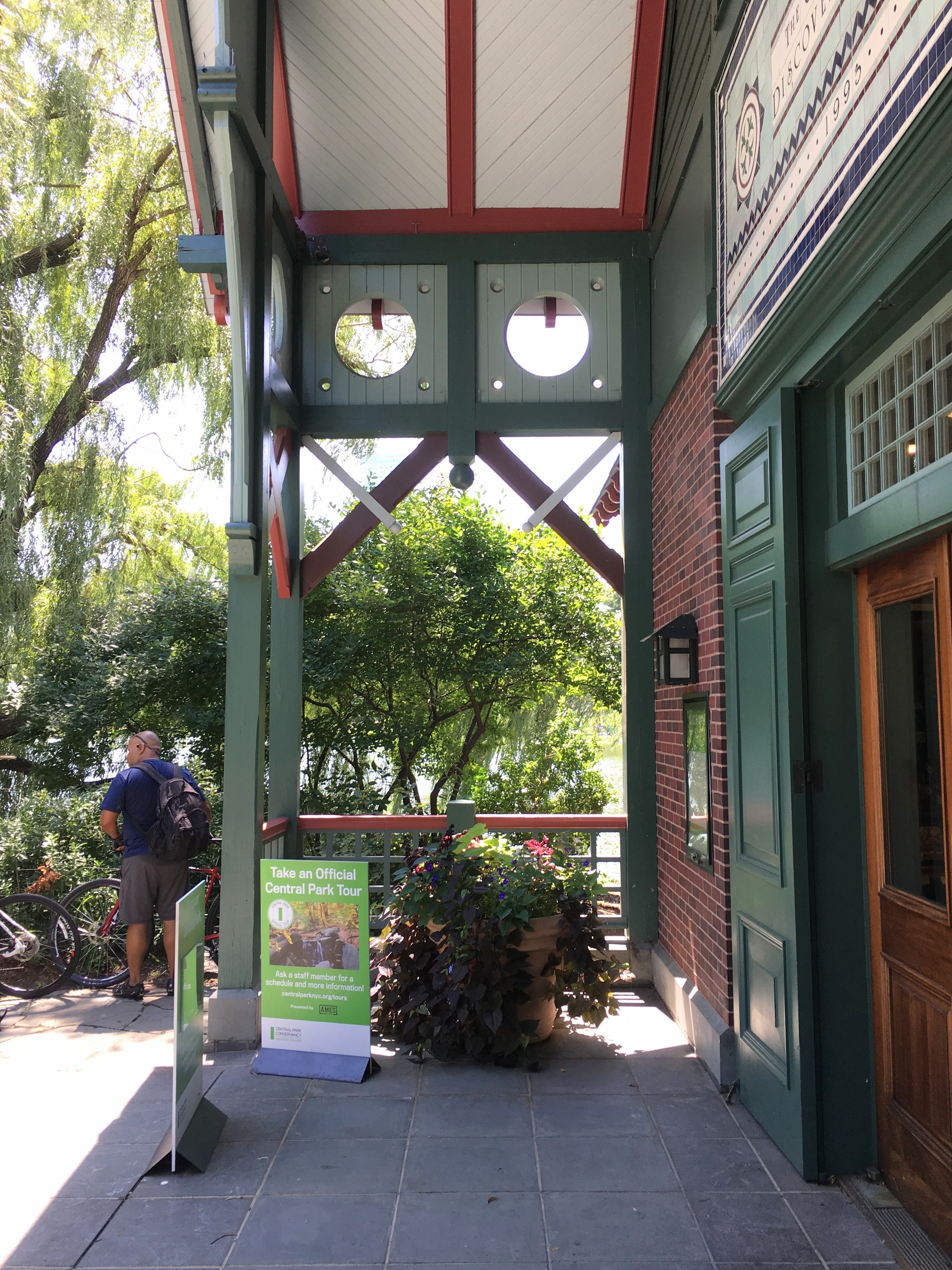
The entrance to the Dana Discovery Center.

For a decade, beginning in 1984, BWB designed the architectural components of the Central Park Conservancy's master plan for the rehabilitation of the long neglected park. In addition to its numerous restoration projects, BWB added two new buildings to the park: Ballplayers House, in 1990, and the Dana Discovery Center, in 1993. The Dana Center, a venue for environmental education, was the centerpiece of the Conservancy's 1986-1993 renovation of Harlem Meer, an eleven-acre lake in Central Park's northeast corner. In a 1993 interview with the journal Progressive Architecture, Dwyer said that the building's "picturesque character" was intended to reinforce the park's "romantic landscape design."

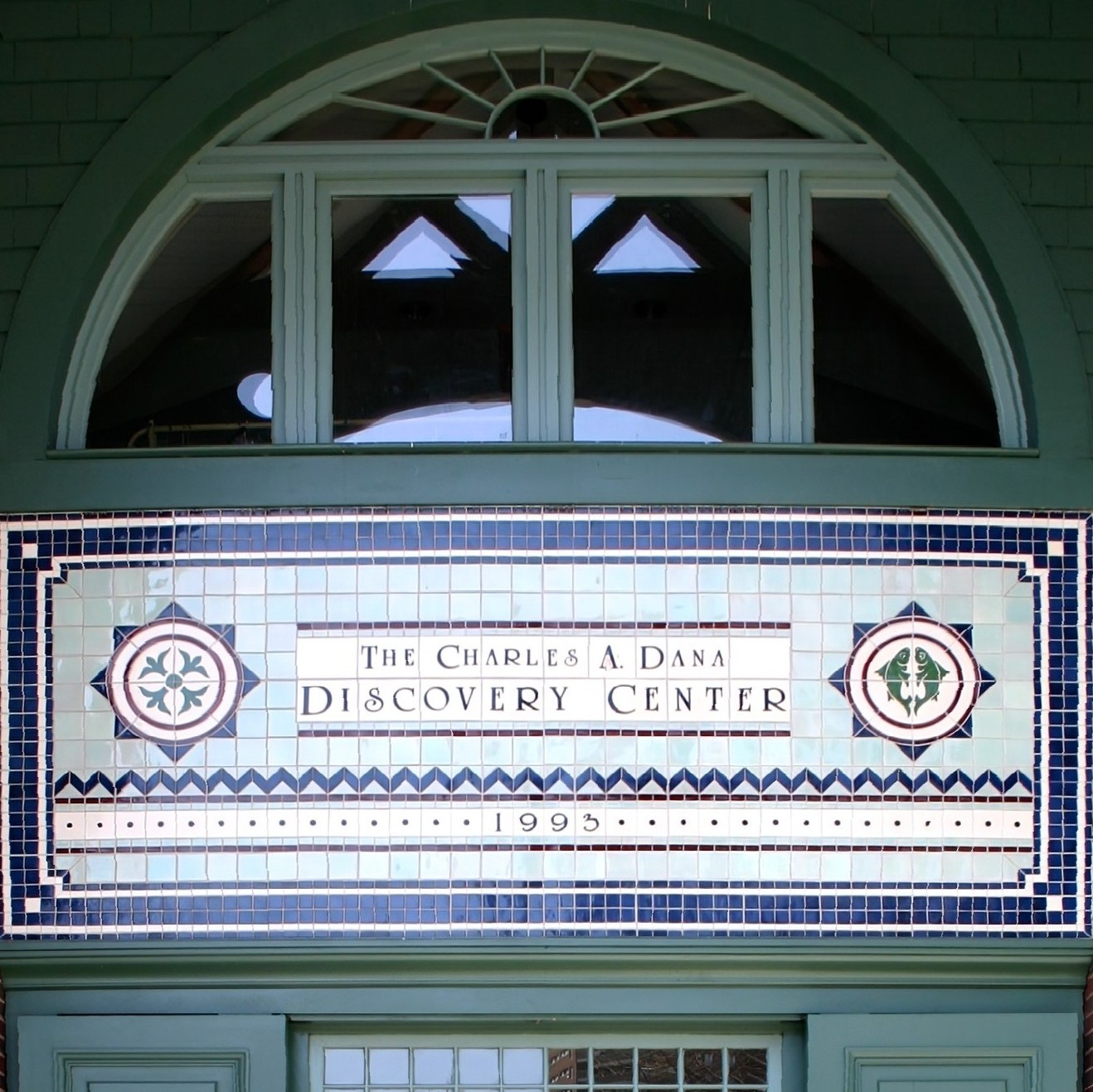
The Fish and Fowl plaque at the entrance to the Dana Discovery Center.

In his book The Architecture of Additions (1998), architect Paul Byard wrote that the Dana Center "is sized to be not too big for its adopted idiom but at the same time an effective presence and marker for one of the defining corners of the park." To Byard, the building's use of the "spiky polychrome architecture of the [earliest] park buildings, with porches, porticos, a steeply pitched and pinnacled tile roof, and rich, multi-colored ornamentation" served to connect, architecturally speaking, the northernmost end of the park, largely devoid of buildings, to the more developed southern part.

=== Classical controversy ===
Dwyer was an advocate for New York's prewar, classical style of architecture and a proponent of its resuscitation. In a 1995 review of architecture's nascent classical revival by The New York Times, reporter Patricia Leigh Brown wrote, "Michael Dwyer...an architect at Buttrick White & Burtis...has recently completed a classical-style yacht" and a "town house on the Upper East Side," a house characterized by Robert A.M. Stern, dean of Yale's School of Architecture, as "scholarly...reflecting the elegant manner of Ange-Jacques Gabriel."

Interviewed by Brown for the article, dean Stern opined that the young classicists were "perhaps the true radicals of their time," whereas architect James Stewart Polshek, formerly dean of Columbia University's School of Architecture called them "bizarrely backward" and "lacking new ideas." Asked to weigh in, Yale historian Vincent Scully declared that "classicism speaks fundamentally to what people want: security and dignity and permanence."

== Dwyer & Sae-Eng ==
=== Meatpacking District pioneers ===
In 1996, Dwyer and interior designer Ungkun Sae-Eng formed Dwyer & Sae-Eng, an architecture and design firm, after which they repurposed a derelict auto-repair garage on Gansevoort Street in Manhattan's Meatpacking District, a newly formed historic district in the northwest corner of Greenwich Village. The renovated space, designed by Sae-Eng, contained a studio for Dwyer's architecture practice, and a venue for Establishment, Sae-Eng's showcase for Southeast Asian art and antiques.

=== Eleanor Roosevelt Monument ===
In 1996, Dwyer was the architect for the Eleanor Roosevelt Monument in New York's Riverside Park, where he supplemented landscape architect Kelly and Varnell's circular bosque of oak trees and Penelope Jencks' bronze statue and granite boulders with granite medallions set into the surrounding bluestone paving (one inscribed with a quotation from a 1958 speech of Roosevelt's; the other with a quotation from Adlai Stevenson's 1962 eulogy for her). At the monument's dedication on October 5, 1996, first lady Hillary Rodham Clinton delivered the keynote address.

=== George F. Baker Jr. House (75 East 93rd Street, Manhattan) ===
In 1997, Dwyer restored the exterior of the George F. Baker Jr. House, built in 1918 at 75 East 93rd Street and designated a landmark in 1969 by the city's Landmarks Preservation Commission. The commission called the house "an outstanding example of a modified Federal style...one of the finest works in New York City by the architects, Delano and Aldrich."

=== Cosmopolitan Club (122 East 66th Street) ===
From 1998 to 2007, Dwyer was the consulting architect to New York's Cosmopolitan Club, helping to restore its clubhouse, designed by architect Thomas Harlan Ellett and awarded the Architectural League's 1933 gold medal.

During his tenure at the club Dwyer restored the entrance hall and staircase; the assembly room; the lounge; and the penthouse garden room.

=== Residential projects ===
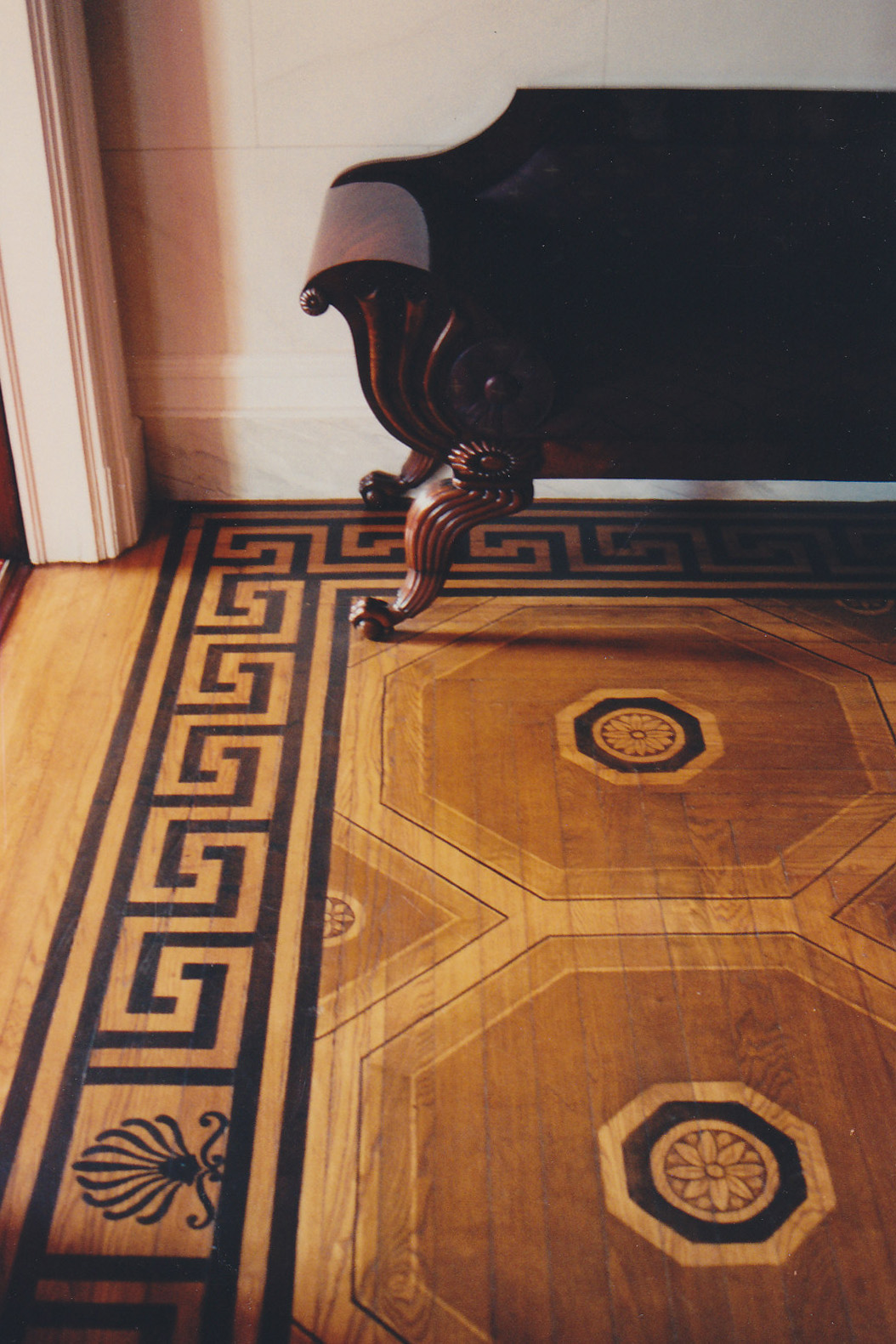
Detail of floor in the entrance hall of an apartment at The Dakota.

On a parallel track, Dwyer prepared designs for New York's private sector, including apartments on Manhattan's east side (960 Fifth Avenue, 720 Park Avenue, and River House); its west side (The Dakota, The Majestic, and The San Remo); and houses in diverse locations such as Bridgehampton, East Hampton, Southampton, Rye, Greenwich, and Nantucket.

=== George F. Baker Jr. carriage house (69 East 93rd Street) ===
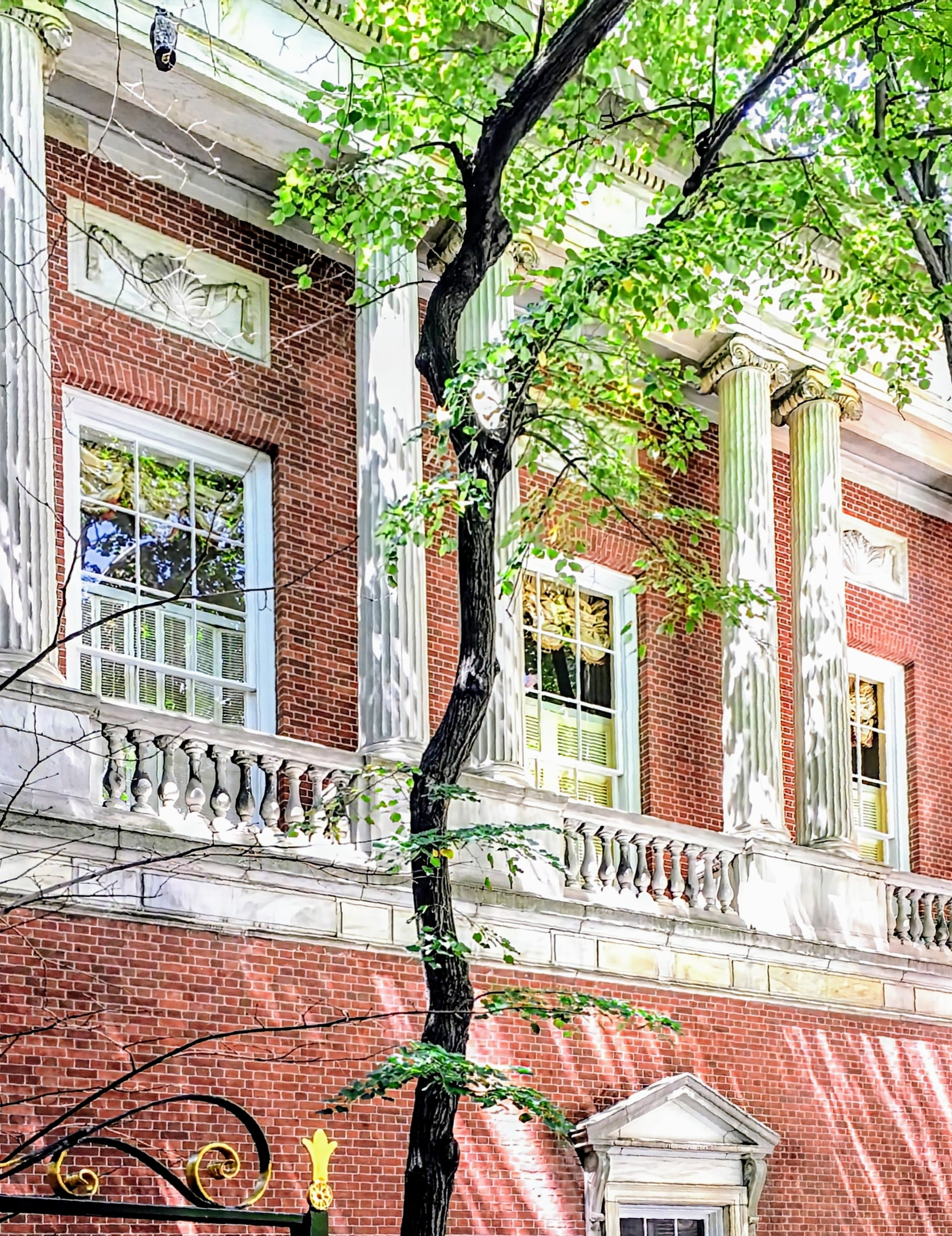
The colonnade at 69 East 93rd Street

In 1995, the financier and preservationist Dick Jenrette engaged Dwyer to design an alteration to his Carnegie Hill townhouse at 69 East 93rd Street, which he described in his memoir, Adventures with Old Houses:

...the house lacked a grand ceremonial entrance staircase...I even went so far as to commission Michael Dwyer, my favorite young neo-classical architect in Manhattan...His plan...would have created an elegant entrance hall and elliptical staircase ascending to the piano nobile.

Jenrette abandoned his plan to renovate No. 69 when he bought the house next door for a second time and returned to 67 East 93rd Street.

=== Edgewater, on the Hudson River ===
In 1995, Jenrette engaged Dwyer & Sae-Eng to design a guesthouse at Edgewater, his villa on the Hudson River, described by Jenrette as a "small Grecian temple with four columns of the Doric order framing a large porch looking downriver. Viewed from the front porch of Edgewater across the lagoon, the new structure serves as an architectural folly extending the sweep of the landscape to the north."

Michael Dwyer also relocated the swimming pool and added a poolhouse, characterized by Jenrette as "charming... with four Doric columns along the side of the pool. The effect is quite Roman—rather like a small corner of Hadrian's Villa." The distance from the guest house to the pool house and back to the main house is a one-mile walk along the riverbank.

=== Hollyhock – Southampton, New York ===
The July 2018 issue of Architectural Digest featured Hollyhock, a new house with extensive gardens in Southampton, New York, designed by Dwyer for real estate executive Mary Ann Tighe, a decade long collaboration with interior designer Bunny Williams reminiscent of the prewar houses of architect David Adler and interior designer Frances Elkins.

In Dwyer's plan for Hollyhock's main wing, an entrance hall leads to an enfilade of three high-studded, south-facing rooms: a dining room designed by Dwyer and embellished by Williams with 18th-century wall paper inset into panels; a living room with boiserie designed by Dwyer, painted a "rich watery blue" by Williams; and a 55-foot-long library, with cabinets and paneling made with old-growth pine, divided into three spaces by projecting bookcases designed by Dwyer in the tradition of David Adler's Wheeler House library (1934); Bigelow & Wadsworth's reading room at the Boston's Atheneum (1914); Charles Follen McKim's University Club library (1904); and Christopher Wren's library at Trinity College (1695).

The principal feature of the entrance hall is Dwyer's design for an elliptical staircase, inspired by a design of Adler's that was inspired by a design of John Russell Pope's, to which Dwyer added a black and white starburst marble floor.

Hollyhock's tile roofs and stucco facades allude to Red Maples, a house designed by the architects Hiss and Weekes, with gardens designed by Ferruccio Vitale, that stood on the site from 1913 until its demolition in 1947.

=== Critiques ===
In its 2025 review of Michael Dwyer's work, the editors of The Franklin Report wrote, "Dwyer has a strong command of historical reference and is adept at renovating prewar building interiors. Sources praise Dwyer's impressive intellect and charming nature while noting that the firm's 'confidence in its skills' may come across as rigid to unsuspecting clients."

In 2015, the Institute of Traditional Architecture ranked Dwyer No.22 on its list of the world's top 50 architects working in the traditional idiom.

== Gallery ==
=== Classical house ===
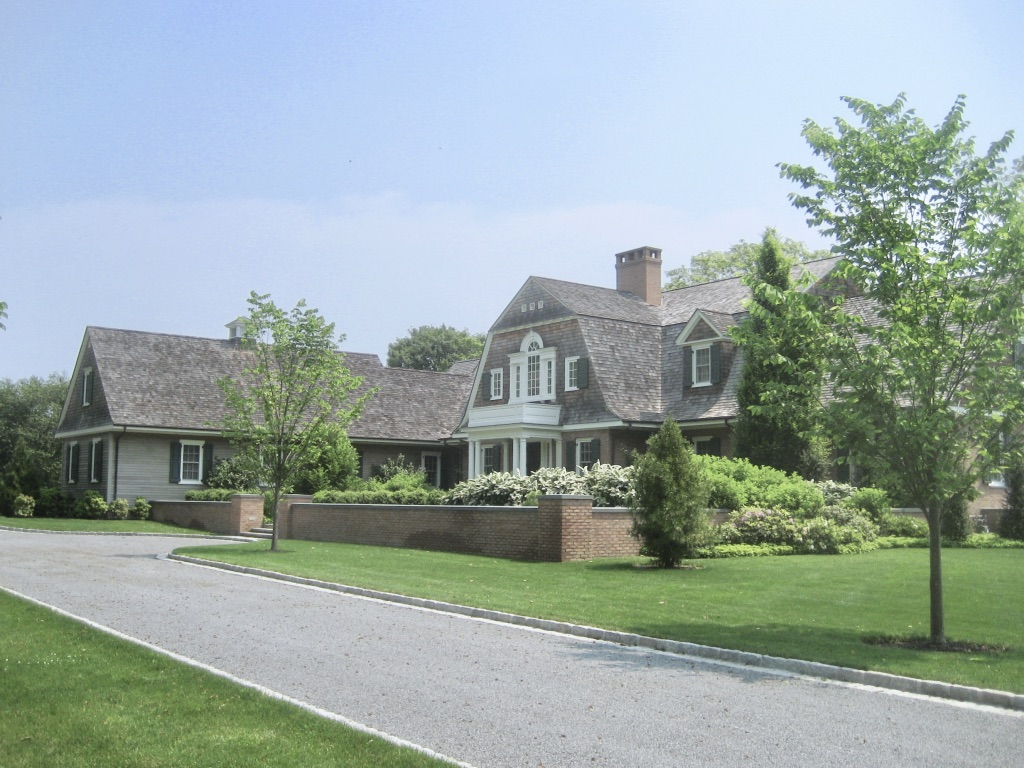

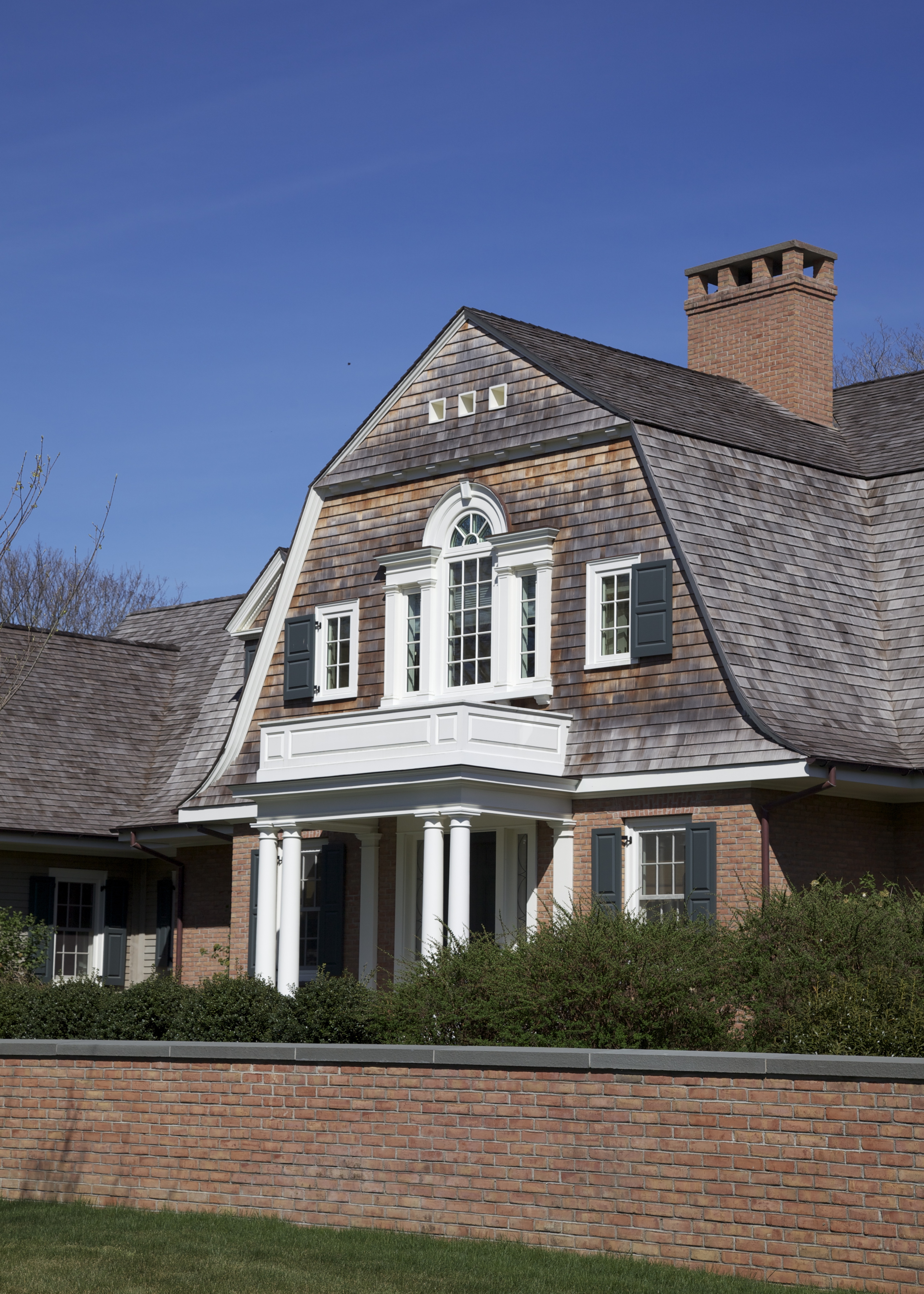

=== Edgewater (Classical Pavilions) ===
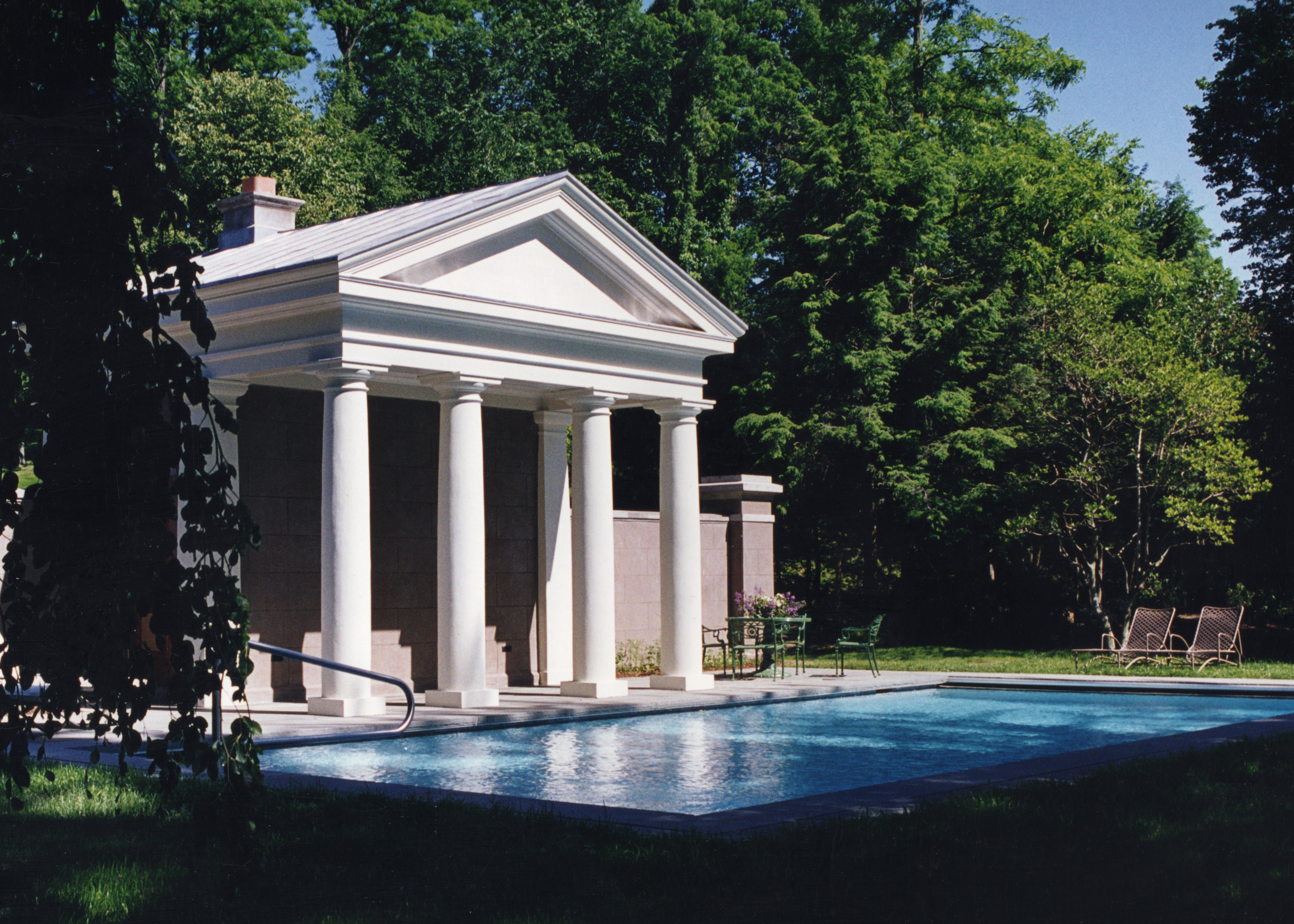
Poolhouse.

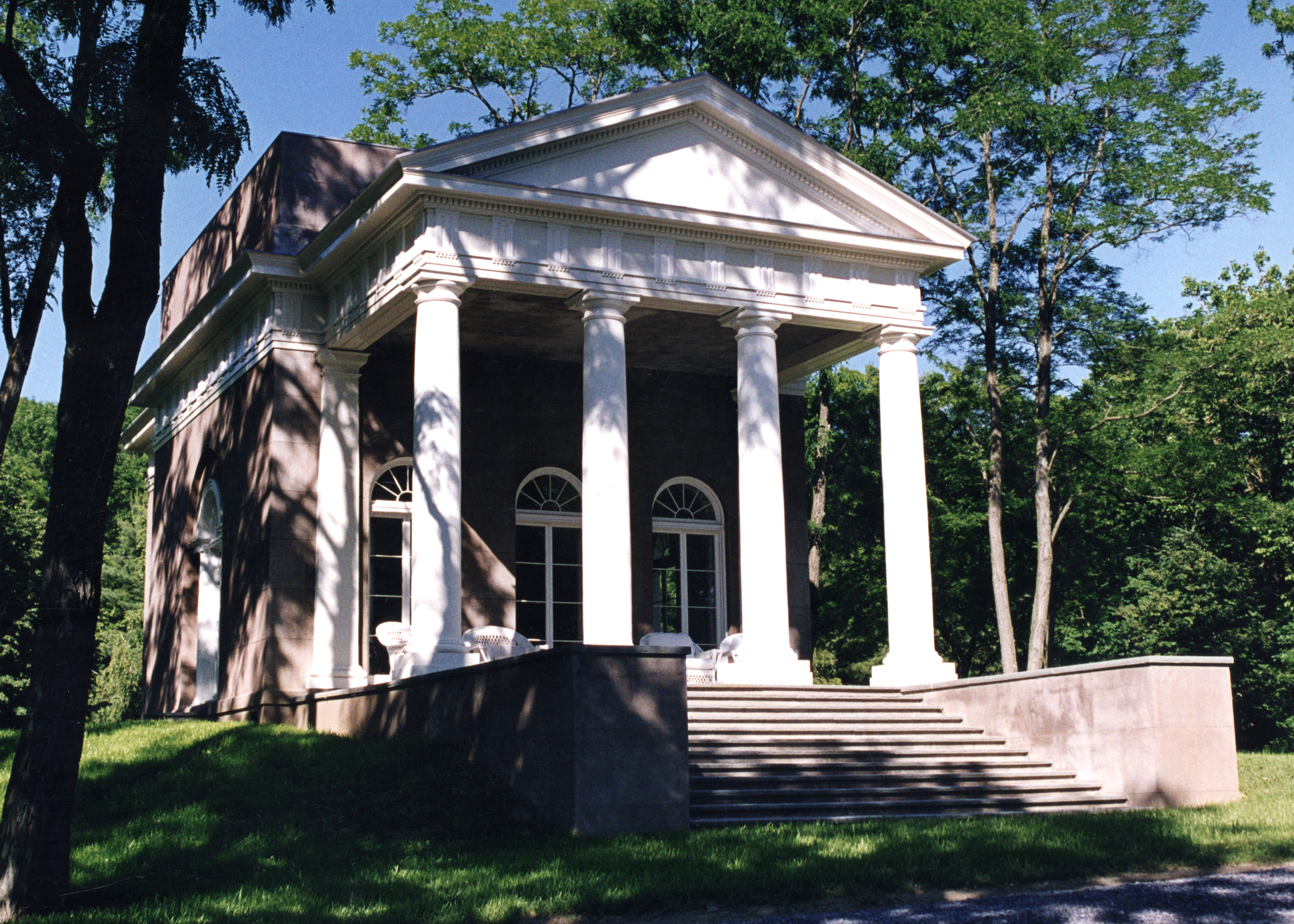
Garden Pavilion.

=== Longview ===
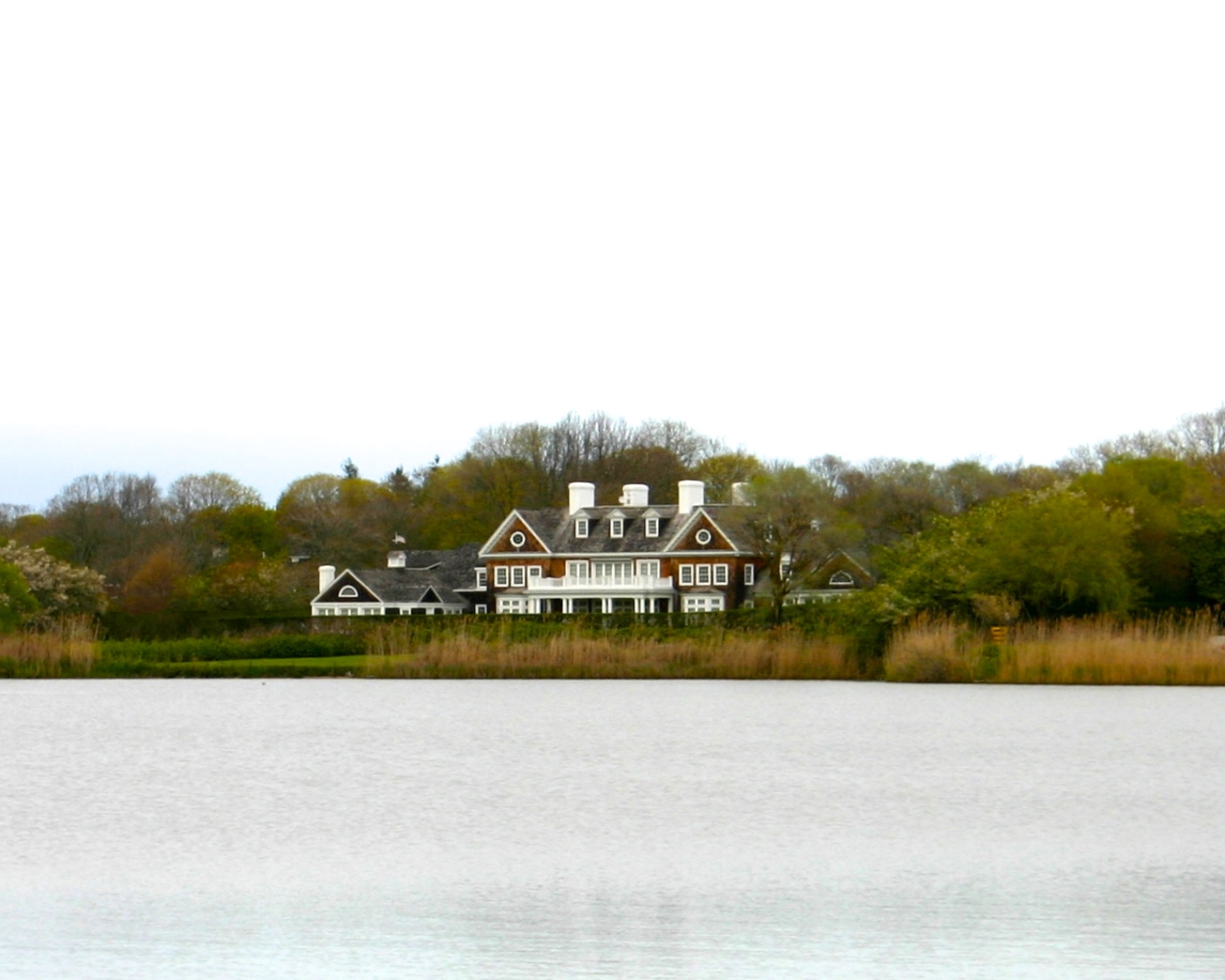
On Lake Agawam.

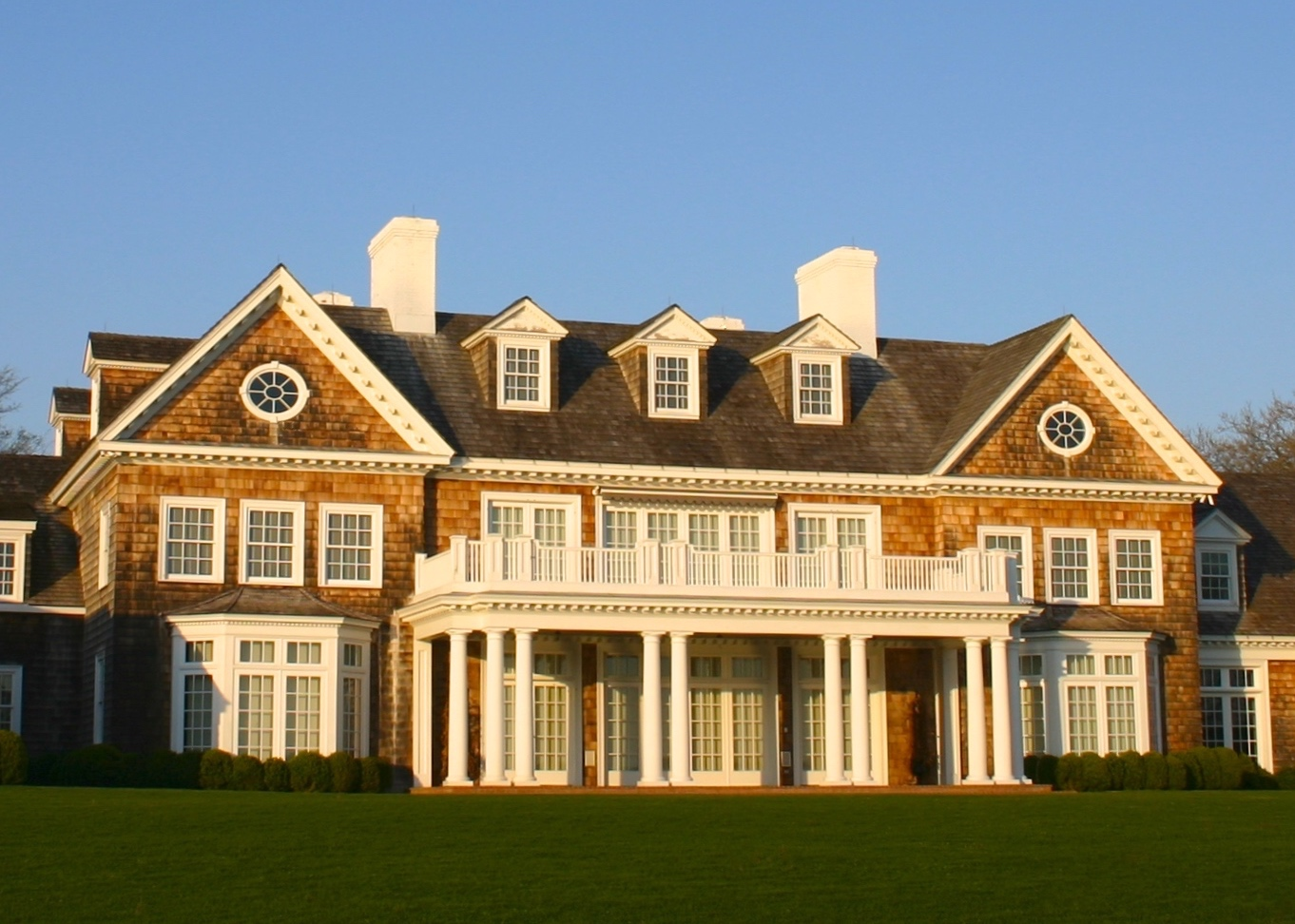
Garden facade.

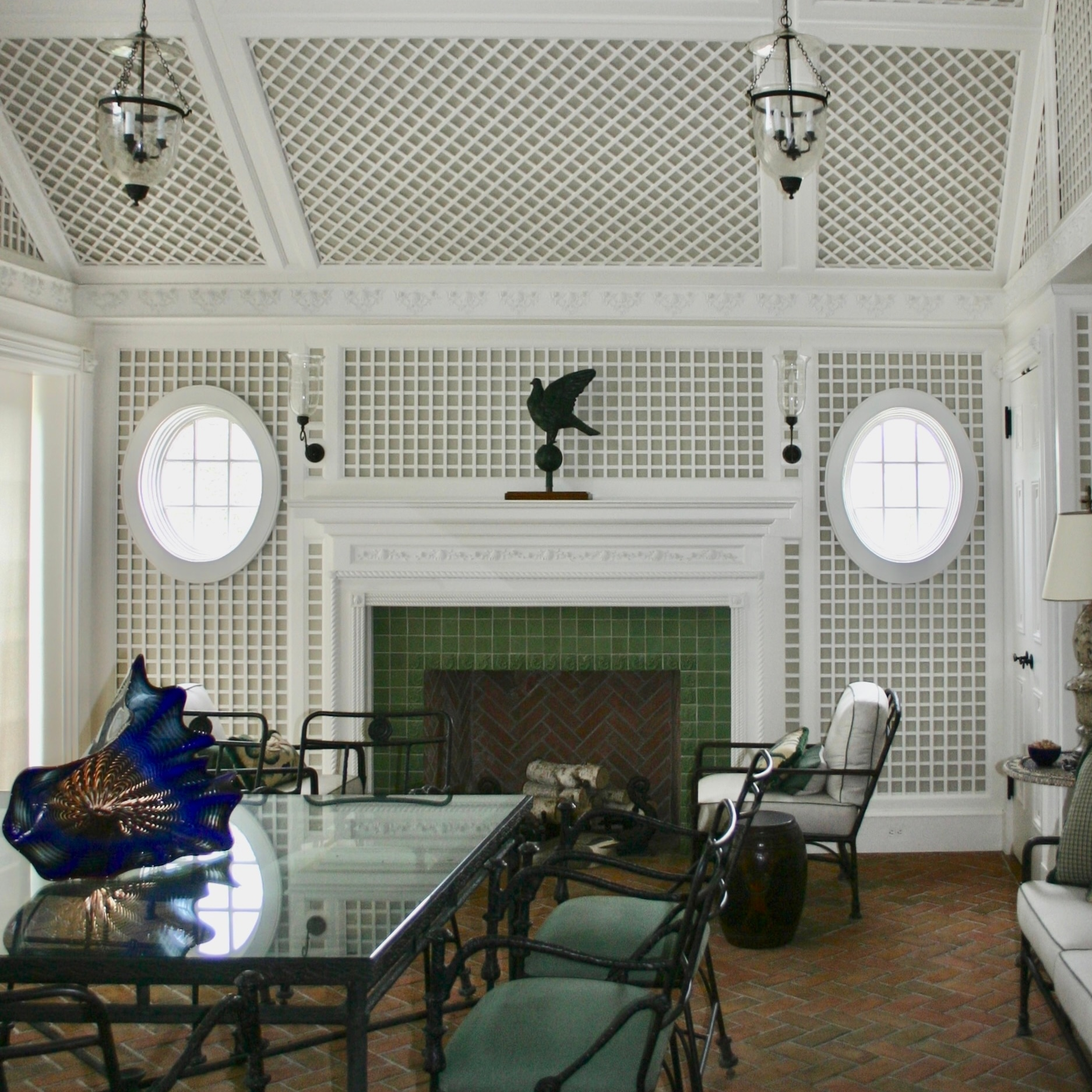
Lattice Room.

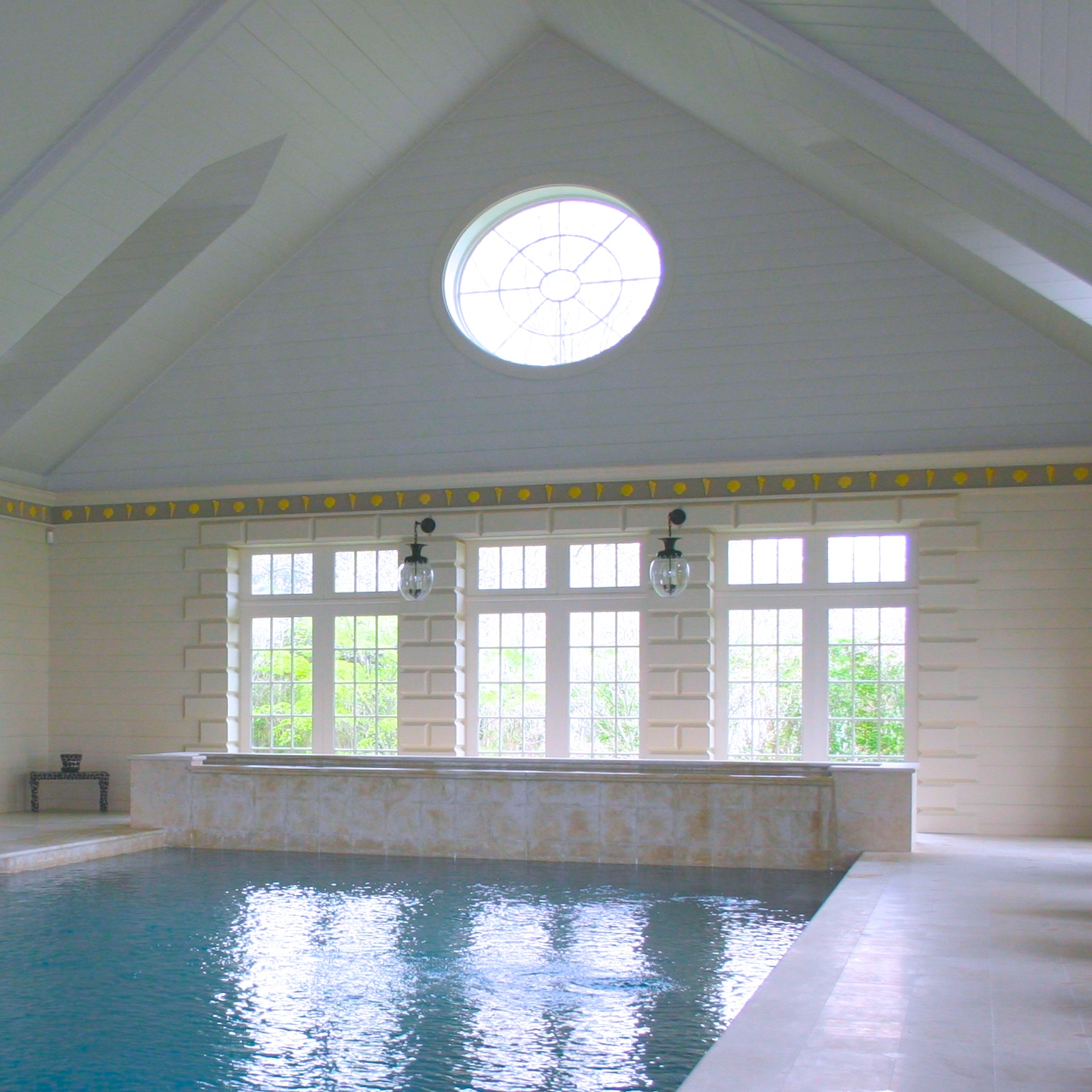
Indoor pool.

=== Hollyhock ===
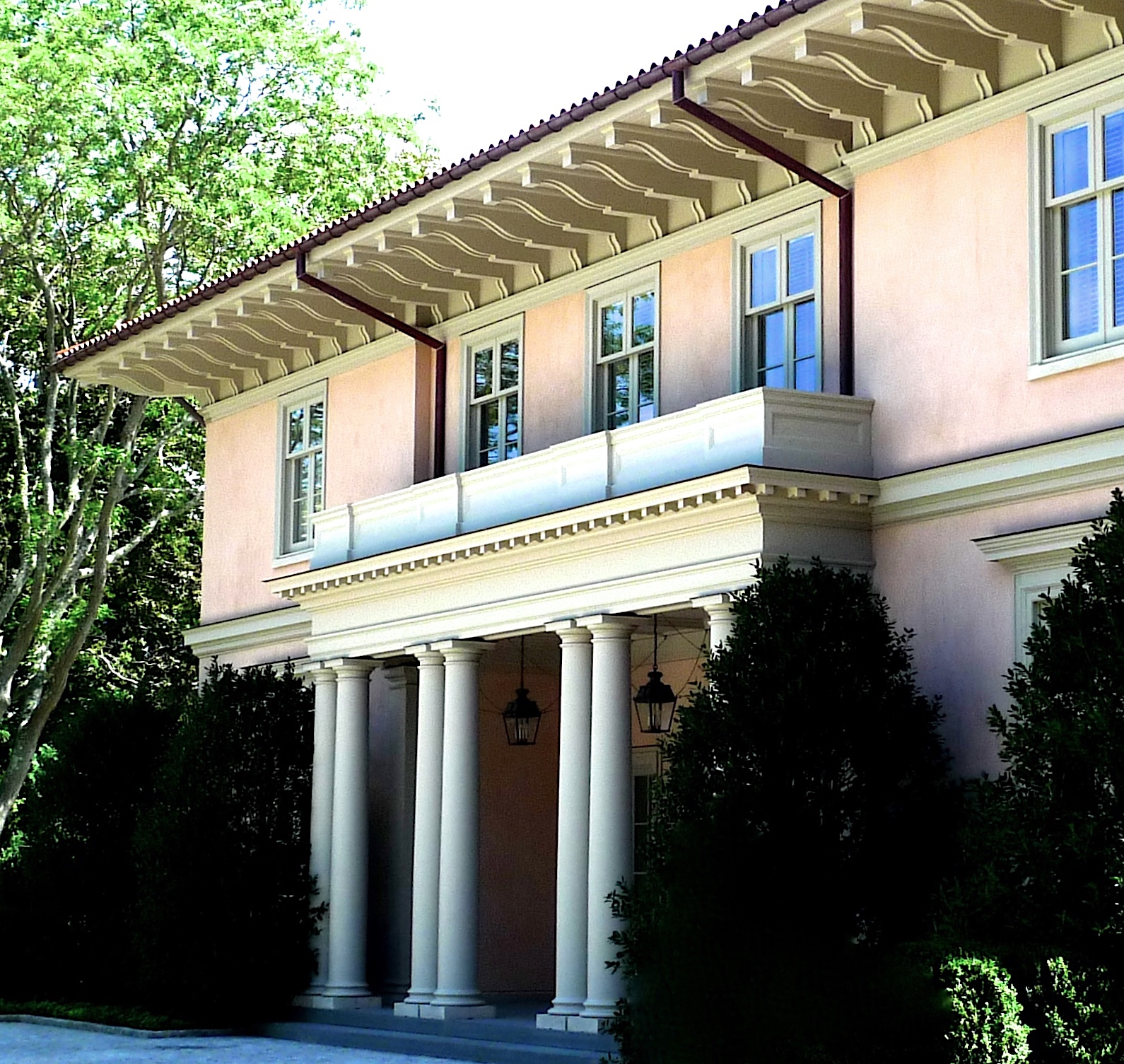

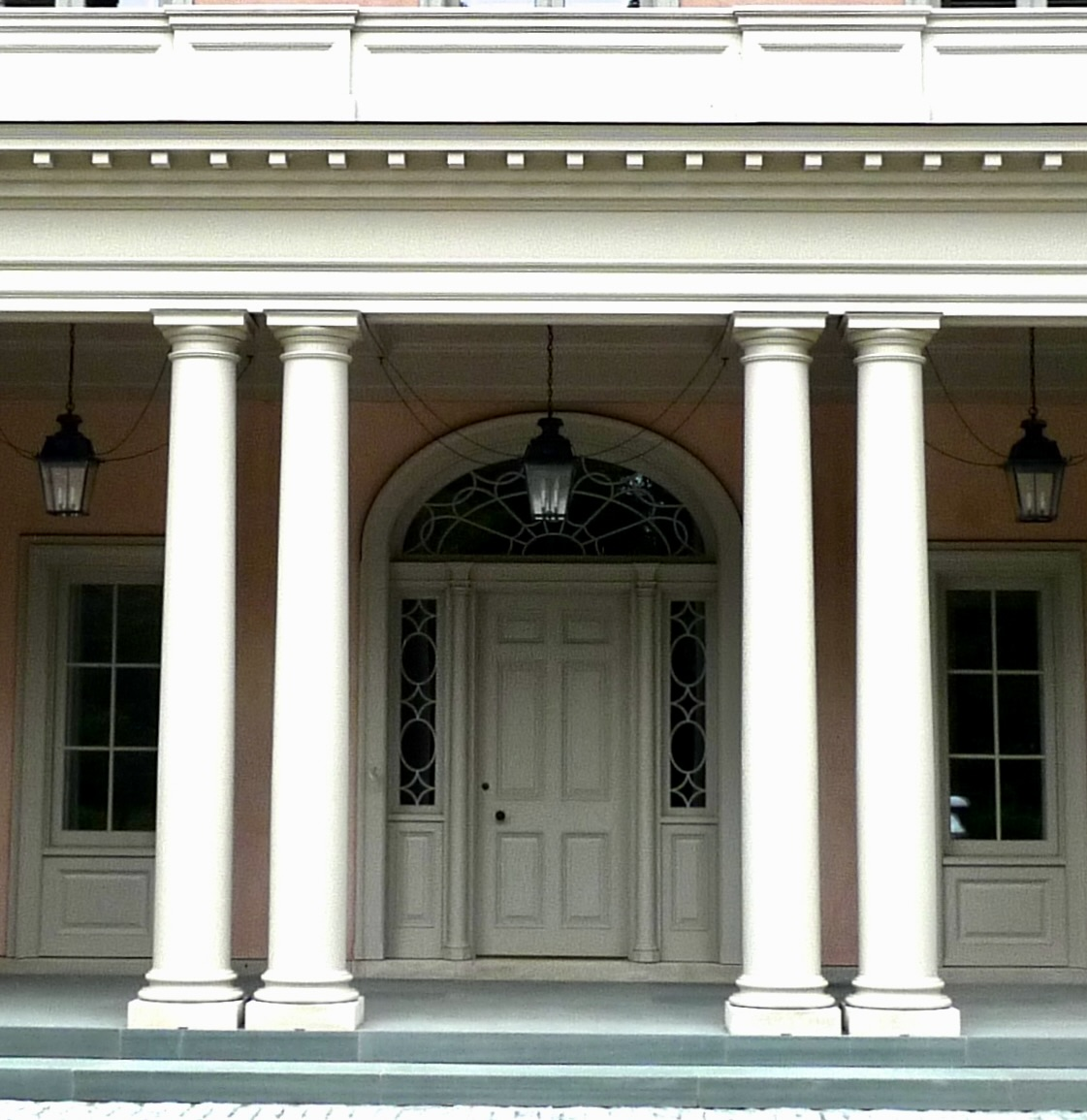
Entrance porch.
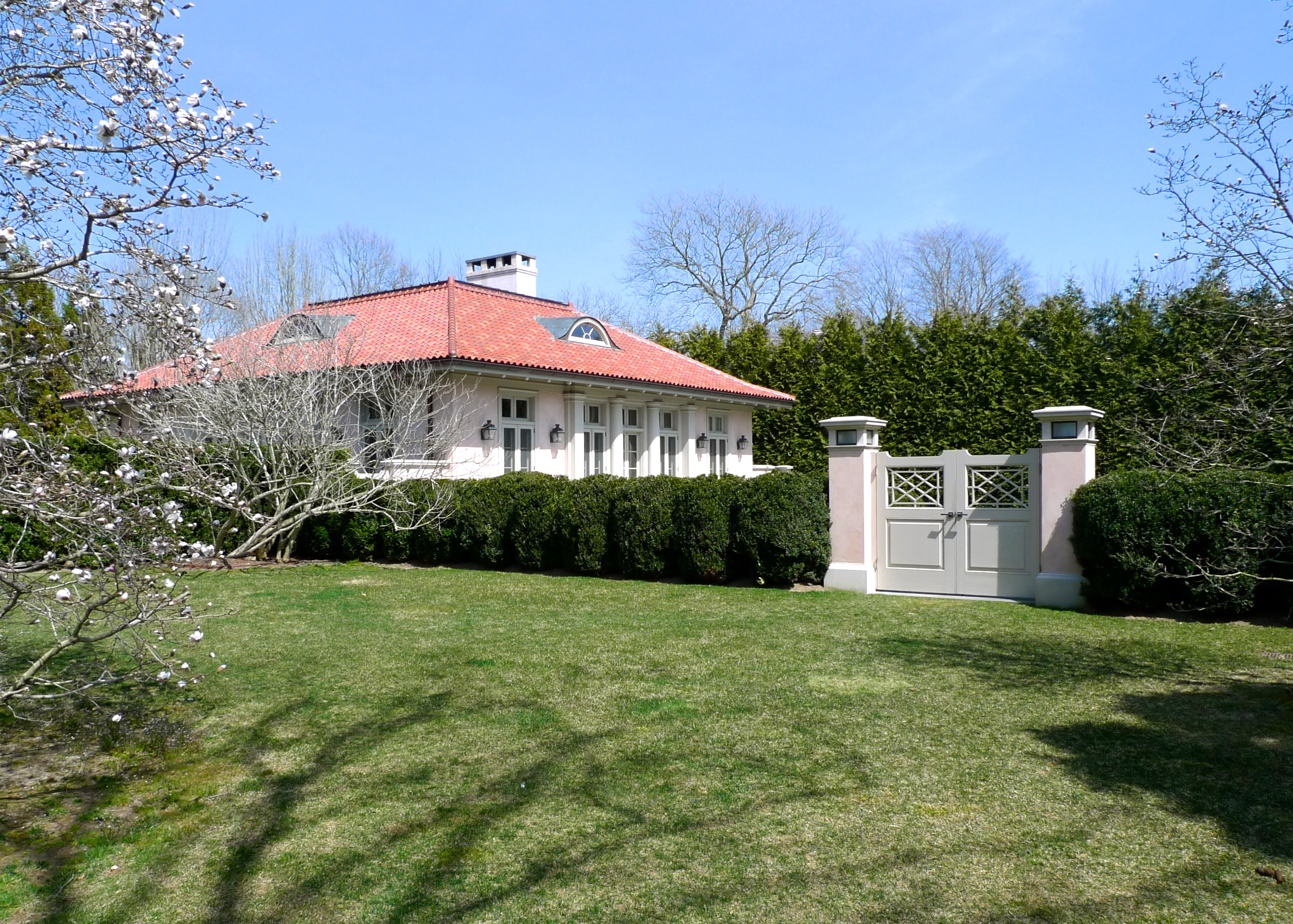
Guest house and garden gate.

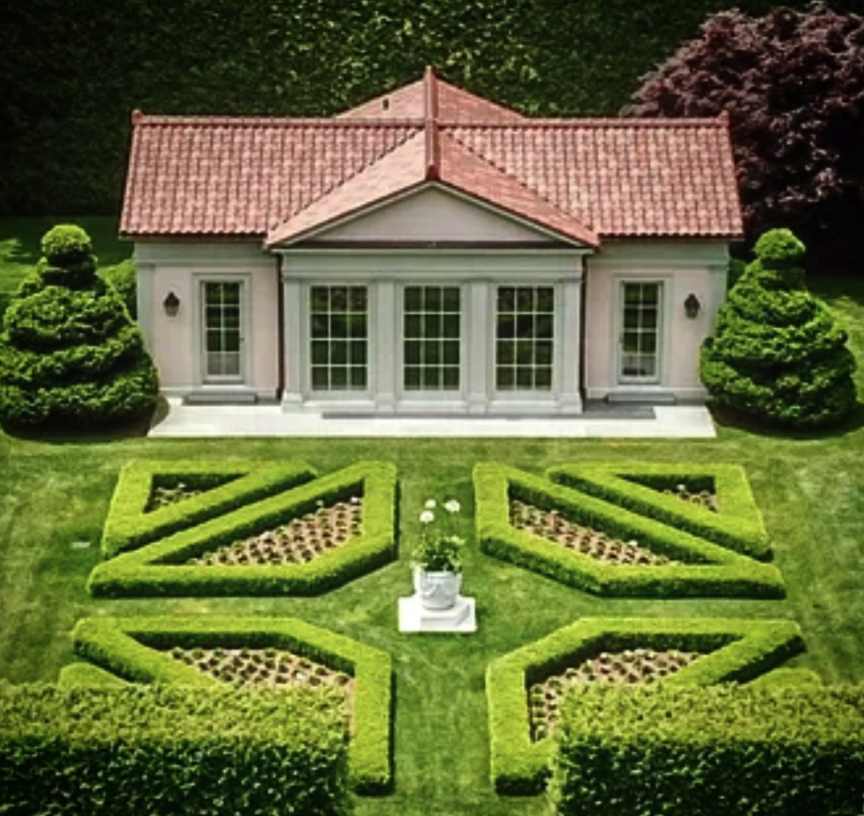
Orangery.

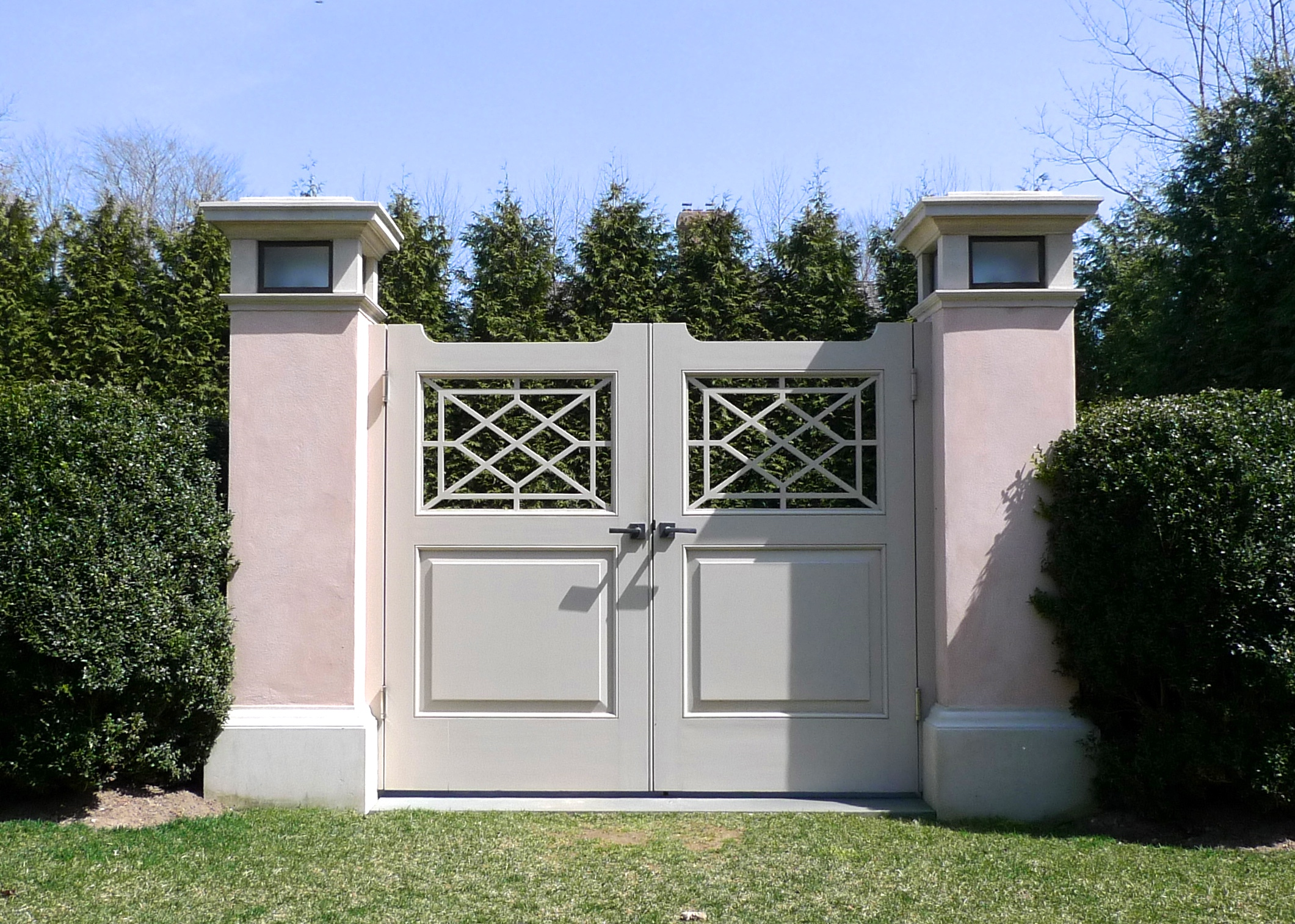
Garden gate.

== Written Works ==
- Carl A. Pearson (author); Michael Dwyer (illustrator). "Up in Central Park on the Shore of Harlem Meer," Architectural Record, (March 1990).
- Mark Alden Branch (author); Michael Dwyer (illustrator) "Flirting with Folly in Central Park," Progressive Architecture (August 1991): 23.
- Michael Dwyer (contributing illustrator). "Proposed Addition to the Harvard Club of New York," Architecture in Perspective No. 7 (American Society of Architectural Illustrators, 1992): 29.
- Richard Economakis (editor), Michael Dwyer (contributing architect). "Proposed Addition to the Harvard Club of New York", Building Classical: A Vision of Europe and America (London: Academy Editions, 1993): 227.
- Michael Dwyer (contributing illustrator). "A View of the Dana Discovery Center, Central Park, New York," Architecture in Perspective No. 8 (American Society of Architectural Illustrators, 1994): 10.
- Michael Dwyer. "Buildings in Public Parks," Clem Labine's Traditional Building (March/April 1995): 26, 28, 30. ISSN 0898-0284:88 (https://search.worldcat.org/issn/0898-0284)
- Gabriele Tagliaventi (editor), Michael Dwyer (contributing author). Urban Renaissance (Grafis, 1996): 212, 215.
- Michael Dwyer (contributing illustrator). "New Master Plan – Trinity School," Architecture in Perspective No. 11 (American Society of Architectural Illustrators, 1996): 83.
- Michael Dwyer (author). "Building with Stone," Clem Labine's Traditional Building (March/April 1996).
- Michael Dwyer (editor). "The Arts and Crafts in Architecture Today," Classicist No. 3 (1996–97): at 90–96.
- Michael Dwyer, ed., with preface by Mark Rockefeller. Great Houses of the Hudson River (Boston, MA: Little, Brown and Company, 2001).
- Míchael Dwyer, with a foreword by Mario Buatta. Carolands (Redwood City, CA: San Mateo County Historical Association, 2006).
- Michael Middleton Dwyer (author). A Brief History of Bonnie Dune (Tripartite Press: 2024). (https://archive.org/details/bonnie-dune-history-2024-04-22)
