= Statue of Samuel Eliot Morison =

Statue in Boston, Massachusetts, U.S.

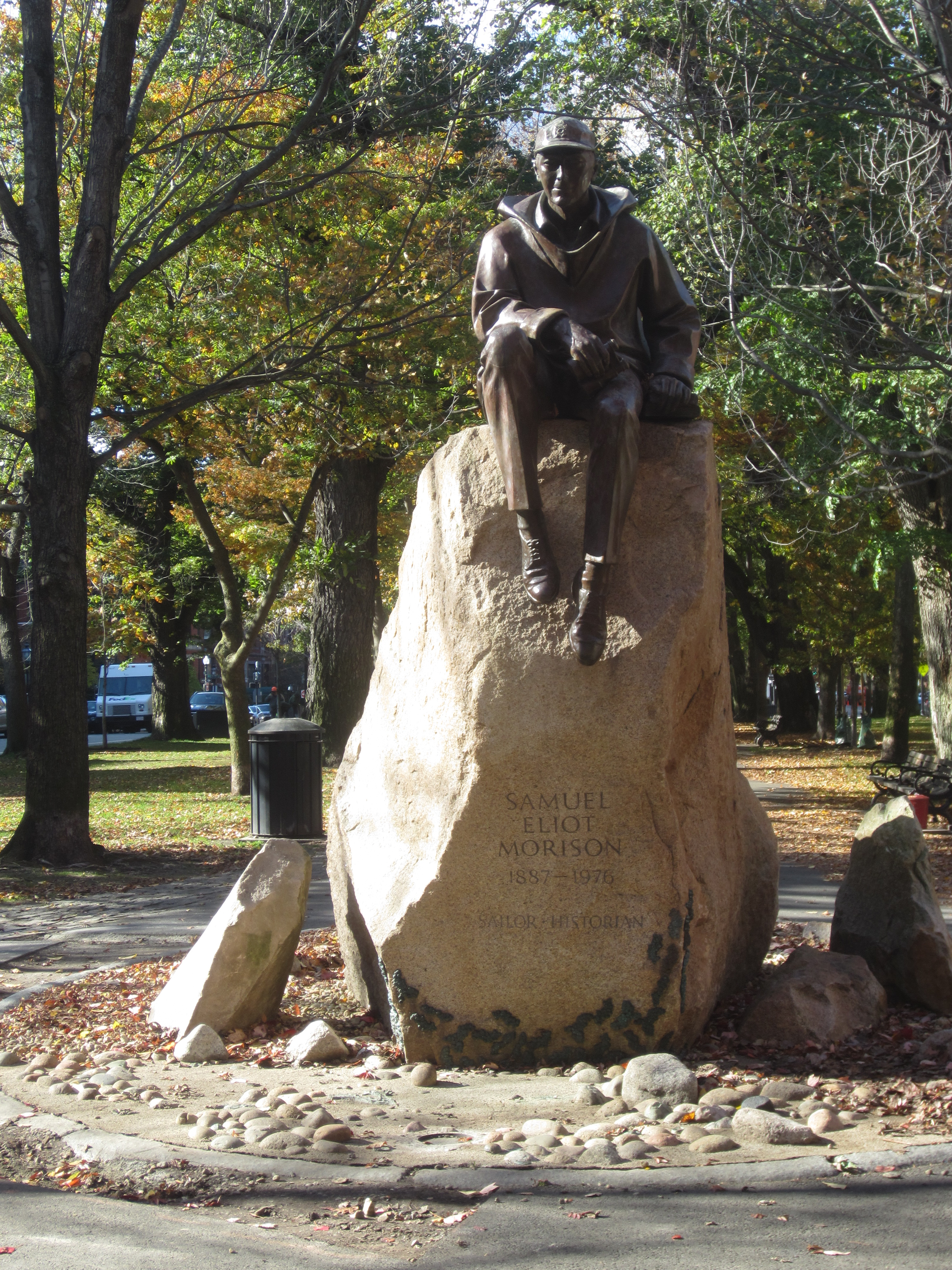
- The statue in 2019
- Artist: Penelope Jencks
- Year: 1982
- Medium: Bronze sculpture
- Subject: Samuel Eliot Morison
- Location: Boston, Massachusetts, U.S.; 42°21′4.2″N 71°4′51″W

A statue of military historian Samuel Eliot Morison by Penelope Jencks is installed along Boston's Commonwealth Avenue Mall, in the U.S. state of Massachusetts.

== Description and history ==
The 1982 bronze sculpture, set atop a sculpted granite boulder, depicts Morison holding binoculars. Below his feet, embedded in the boulder, are bronze casts of crabs, shells, and starfish. Etched into a smaller rock beside the boulder is inscribed his counsel to young writers: ”Dream dreams, then write them aye, but live them first.”

The work was surveyed as part of the Smithsonian Institution's "Save Outdoor Sculpture!" program in 1993.

== See also ==
- 1982 in art
