= McGowan's Pass =

Topographical feature in New York City's Central Park

Coordinates: 40°47′36″N 73°57′18″W

McGowan's Pass (sometimes spelled "McGown's") is a topographical feature of Central Park in New York City, just west of Fifth Avenue and north of 102nd Street. It pre-dates the park, and was incorporated into the park's East Drive in the early 1860s, during the park's creation. A steep hill descending into a switchback road, it is a popular training route for competitive bicyclists and runners.

Although the name is usually omitted from maps today, McGowan's Pass was clearly marked on charts of the region from the Revolutionary War until the early 20th century. It acquired its name from the McGowan or McGown family who kept a tavern near there from 1756 through the Revolutionary period, and owned the surrounding property until the 1840s. The area was incorporated into Central Park after 1860, when the park's boundaries were extended north from the line of 106th Street to 110th Street, and the Harlem Meer was built in the park's northeast corner.

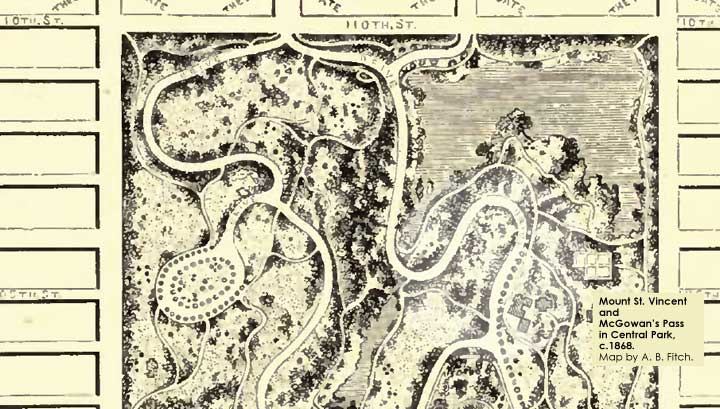
1868 map of Central Park, detail

Notable buildings and structures of Central Park. Click on the map and then on the points for details.
'"`UNIQ--templatestyles-00000009-QINU`"''"`UNIQ--templatestyles-0000000A-QINU`"'

== Colonial era ==
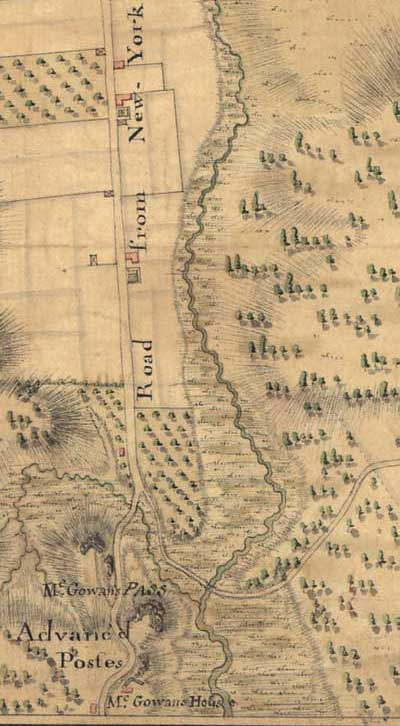
McGowan's Pass and Kingsbridge Road at the start of the British Occupation. Detail of C.J. Sauthier map for the Earl of Percy, November 1776. The McGowans' Black Horse Tavern is at the very bottom, on the west side of the highway, across and slightly south of their house. A 1789 road map by Christopher Colles identifies the tavern house as "Leggets".

In Dutch Colonial days, this area of north Manhattan was part of the "commons," land administered by the community of Nieuw Haarlem as a whole. During the late 17th century, as Manhattan passed back and forth between the Dutch and English, the colony of New Harlem lost its autonomy. Common Lands were sold off in 1712. Much of this property in upper Manhattan passed to members of the extensive Benson and Dyckman families, who would continue to own much of northern Manhattan well into the 19th century.

In the 1740s, Jacob Dyckman, Jr. purchased the lands along the Pass from his Uncle George. He planted orchards and built a house and outbuildings, including a public house, "At the Sign of the Black Horse." During a yellow fever epidemic in 1752, the Colonial Assembly decamped from downtown New York and met in the Black Horse tavern, while boarding a half-mile east at the farm of Dyckman's cousin, Benjamin Benson.

In 1756, Dyckman decided to move back north near his family in Spuyten Duyvil, and build a new tavern by the Harlem River. He advertised his Harlem property for sale and sold it a few days later to his in-laws, Daniel McGown (as he spelled himself) and Catherine Benson McGown. With their son Andrew, the McGowns ran the Black Horse tavern until after the Revolutionary War.

== Revolutionary War to Civil War ==
From 1776 until 1783, during the British occupation of New York, McGowan's Pass was a key high-ground position on the route between New York City to the south and Fort Knyphausen (Fort Washington) to the north. For most of this period, the area around the Pass was the site of a Hessian encampment. After the Treaty of Paris, British and Hessians marched through the Pass when evacuating north Manhattan; and George Washington likewise came through the Pass when he reentered New York on Evacuation Day, November 25, 1783.

After the war, John Leggett and his family moved into the Black Horse and managed it as "Leggett's Halfway Tavern."

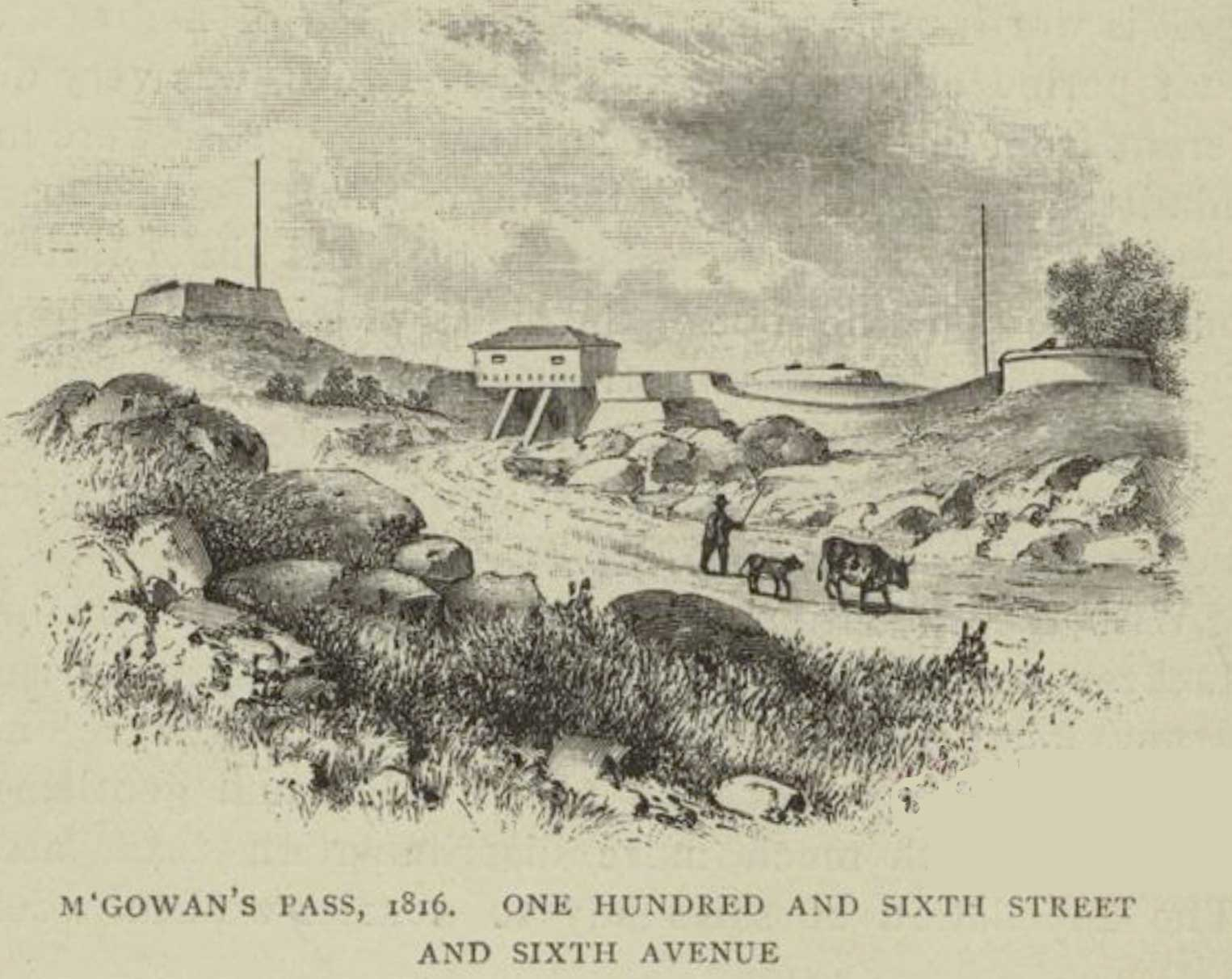
Looking southwest in 1816. Pass gatehouse with fortifications on either side.

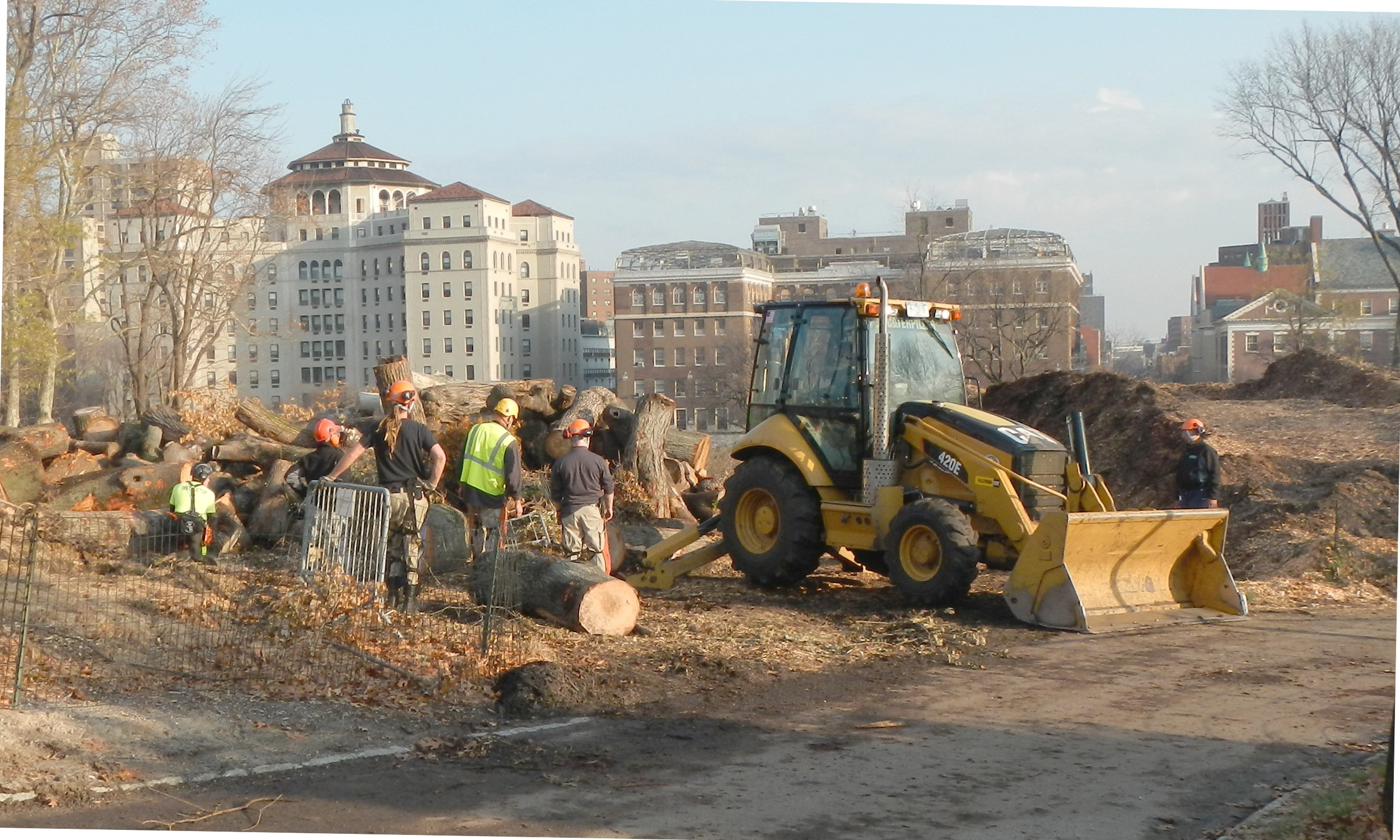
Temporary dump for Hurricane Sandy debris, 2012

During the War of 1812, a series of fortifications and redoubts were put up nearby. These included Blockhouse No. 1, completed two days before the war's end in 1814, which still stands on a hill in the North Woods. Also built nearby were Fort Clinton, Fort Fish, and Nutter's Battery along the north side of the Pass, remnants of which can still be seen. There was also a gatehouse straddling the road just east of present-day Lasker Rink, near the grid coordinates of 107th Street and Lenox Avenue (formerly Sixth Avenue), where present-day East Drive makes its first downhill switchback. This 1860s route of East Drive was partially constructed over the old earthwork fortifications.

The chapel of Mount St. Vincent's Academy, a convent school built around the old McGown house, was built in 1847. It became the U.S. General Hospital or St. Joseph's Military Hospital, during the American Civil War from 1862 to 1865, after the Mount St. Vincent Academy moved north to its present campus in Riverdale. From 1859 to 1863, Frederick Law Olmsted and his family lived in the Mount St. Vincent's buildings, while Olmsted directed the landscaping of Central Park. The campus existed until 1881.

== Post-Civil War ==
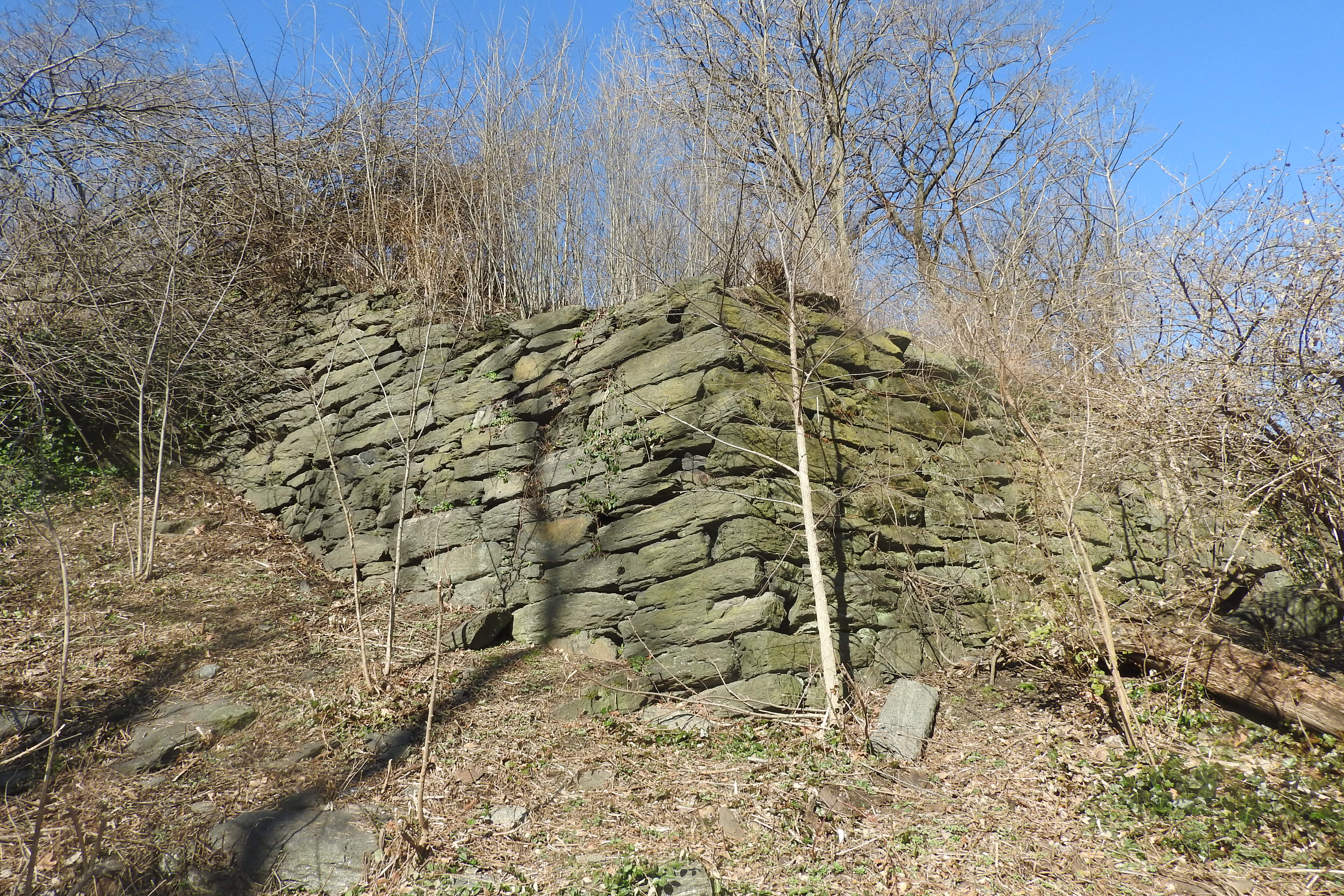
Retaining walls for Mt St Vincent

McGown's Pass Tavern, formerly Mount St. Vincent's Hotel, on East Drive near 104th Street in Central Park. Photo circa 1915.

From the 1860s to the 1880s, the Park Commission leased out the old school grounds as a sculpture museum and tavern, while the hill continued to be known as Mount St. Vincent's. When Central Park was being built, a lake called Harlem Meer was constructed from a natural waterway north of McGowan's Pass. A new section of East Drive was made to veer sharply to the west and south and again to the north, bypassing the Meer.

=== Tavern ===
A refreshment house, known as Mount St. Vincent's Hotel, opened at McGowan's Pass in 1883–1884. Its proprietor until 1890 was Patrick H. McCann, brother-in-law to local Tammany Hall leader Richard Croker and sometime friend of Hugh Grant, Mayor of New York. During the Fassett Investigation in 1890, McCann testified that he lost his lease to the tavern because he refused to provide Croker, Grant and their political associates with free entertainment; in retaliation for which Croker and Grant began to bad-mouth the restaurant as a disreputable house patronized by lowlifes. After McCann the tavern was leased by Gabriel Case, and finally by John Scherz.

The name of the tavern caused confusion for visiting parents who told their cab driver to take them to Mount St. Vincent's and found themselves at a large, convivial saloon in Central Park, instead of a sedate convent school. Accordingly the Park Commission officially designated the region "McGown's Pass" [sic] on maps and signage, and renamed the "Mount St. Vincent's Hotel" roadhouse as "McGown's Pass Tavern." The tavern's new name hearkened back to a local watering-hole of a century before, the Black Horse Tavern, popularly known as McGowan's.

In 1906 a plaque commemorating the "McGown" family and the Pass was installed nearby at the Fort Clinton memorial. In 1915 the tavern was closed down and its furnishings auctioned off. The New York Times reported that its equipment, furniture, sporting prints, and "Old Gabe," the tavern's yellow parrot, brought in barely $1,500. The old tavern's driveways and foundations remain in use by the Central Park Conservancy, which uses it as a composting area and has reverted to calling it "The Mount."
