= Nutter's Battery =

Coordinates: 40°47′48″N 73°57′10″W

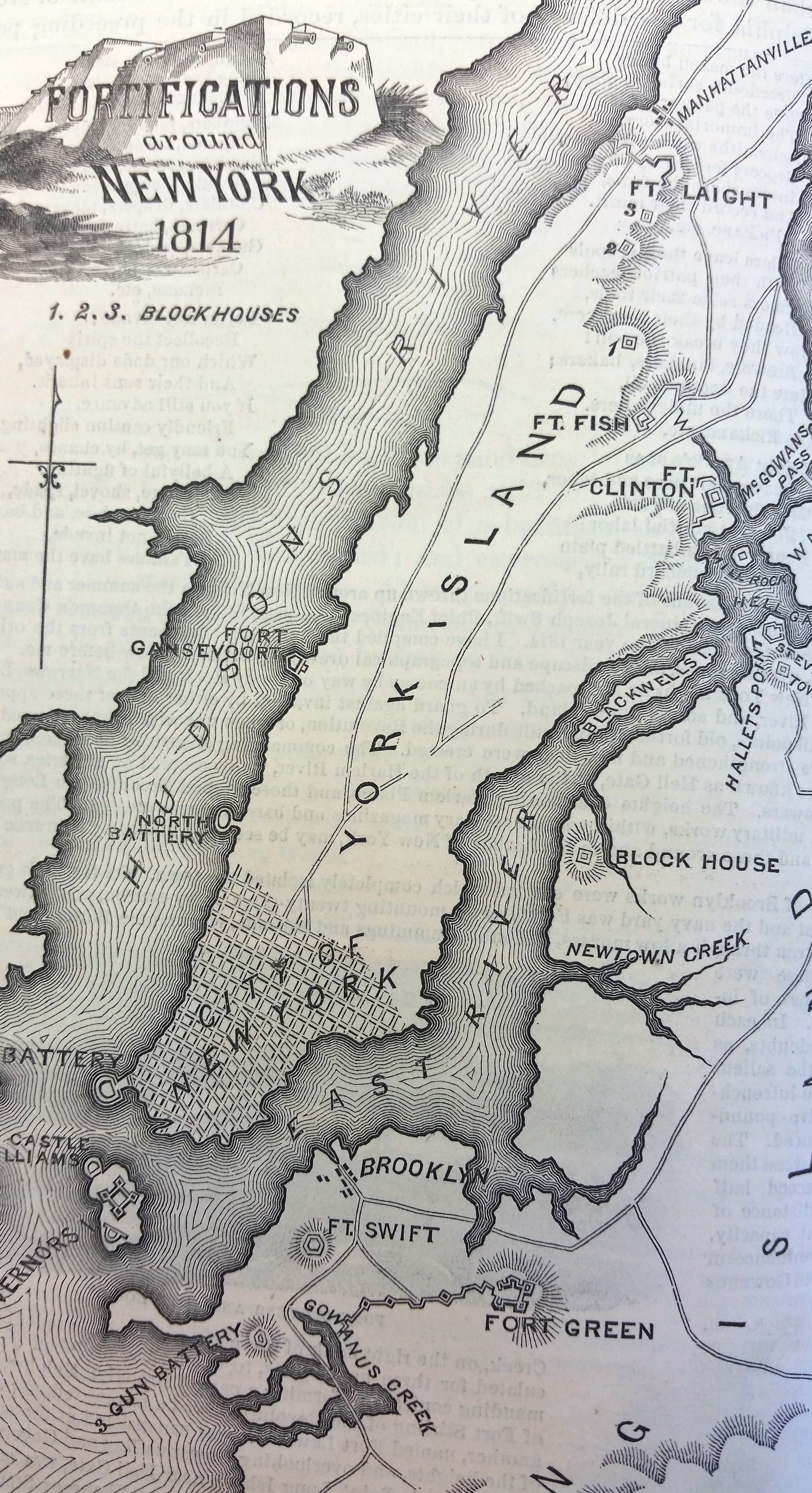
Manhattanville forts

Nutter's Battery is a scenic overlook in the North Woods of Central Park in Manhattan, New York City, overlooking the Harlem Meer to the north. The battery was built during the War of 1812 as a small part of an extensive system of fortification intended to defend against a British invasion from the north. After the war, the wall fell into ruin and eventually disappeared. The Parks Department built a low wall in 1945 to mark the spot, and the Central Park Conservancy rebuilt the wall in 2014, adding paths and planting. The battery was named after Valentine Nutter, who owned the surrounding property.

According to maps and illustrations of the time, the Battery was a redoubt connected to Fort Fish, by earthworks along the Old Post Road. At the line of 107th Street and Sixth Avenue (Lenox Avenue), the earthworks led to a gatehouse in the road at McGowan's Pass. From there the earthworks continued up a rocky hill to Fort Clinton.

== See also ==
- Blockhouse No. 1
