= Fort Clinton (disambiguation) =

Fort Clinton may refer to:

- Fort Clinton, a Hudson River, New York fortification held by revolutionary troops until destroyed by British forces in 1777
- Fort Clinton (West Point), a later Hudson River fortification, now the site of the US Military Academy
- Castle Clinton, a fortification on the southern tip of Manhattan Island, New York, later used as an immigration center
- Fort Clinton (Central Park), an 1814 fortification on Manhattan Island
