= Fort Fish =

Former fort in New York City's Central Park

Coordinates: 40.7951°N 73.9542°W

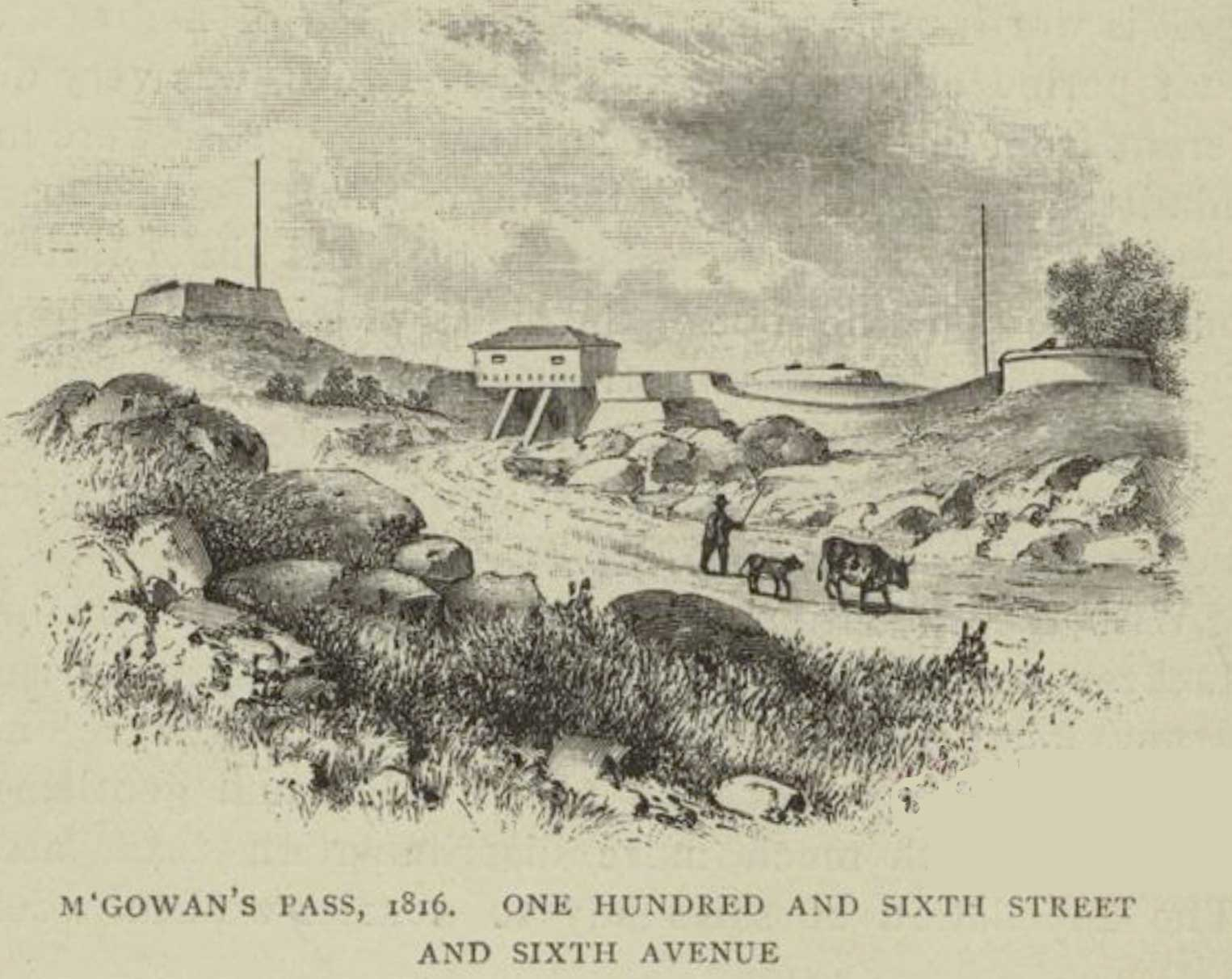
Fort Fish on right in 1816

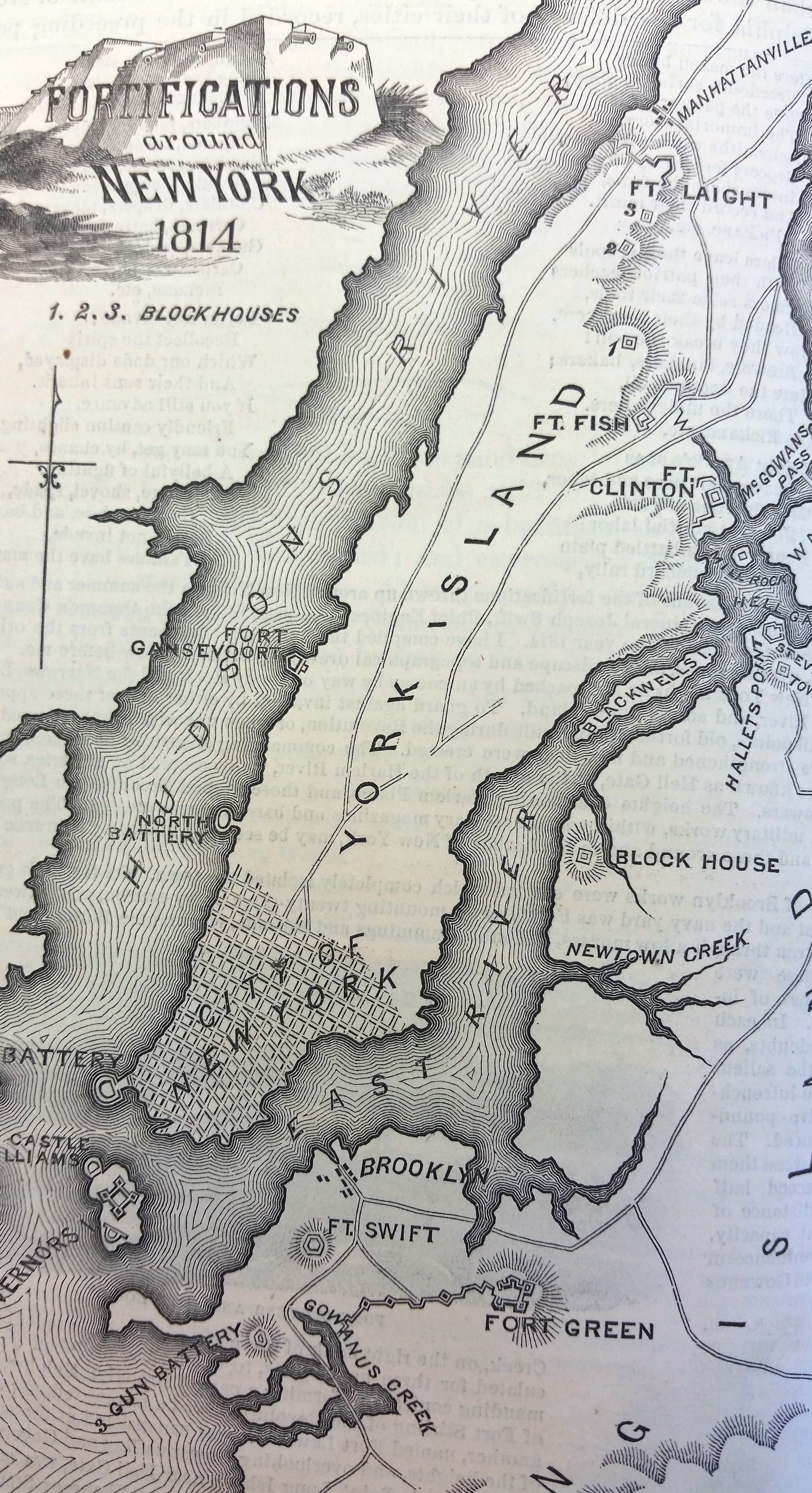
Manhattanville forts

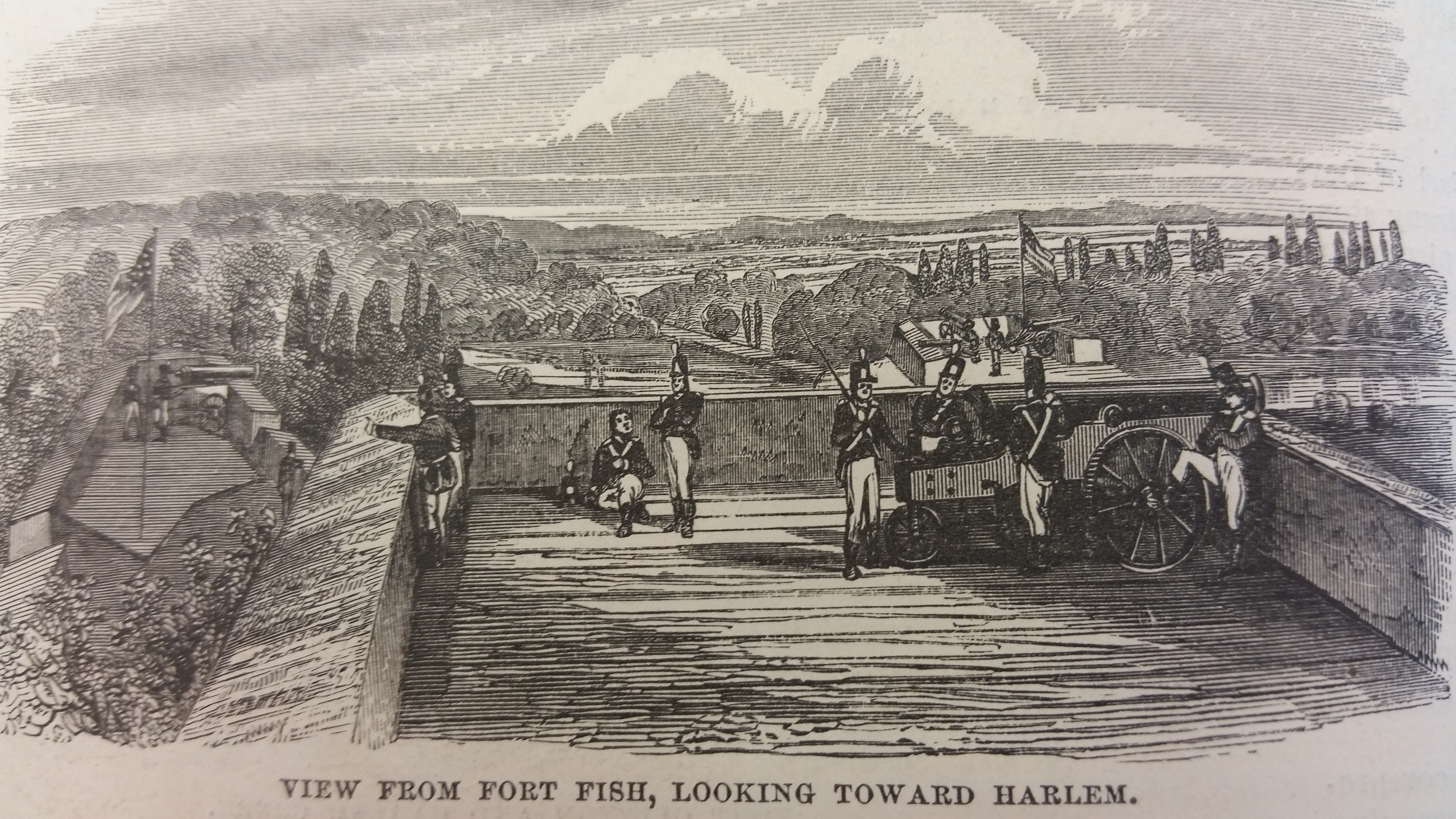
Fort Fish

Notable buildings and structures of Central Park. Click on the map and then on the points for details.

Fort Fish was an earthworks fortification within what is now Central Park, Manhattan, New York City. The fort was located on East Drive near 105th Street, directly across from the Central Park Conservancy's composting area, which was once a girls' school. Currently the only memorial on the Fort Fish site is a white marble bench dedicated to the memory of Andrew Haswell Green, the 19th century educator and city planner.

The fort was named for Nicholas Fish, chairman of New York's Committee of Defense during the War of 1812. (He was also father of U.S. Senator and Secretary of State Hamilton Fish). Only Blockhouse No. 1 remains of the system of defense.

Fort Fish was the southern extremity of a complex of forts built along a portion of the Old Post Road, or Kingsbridge Road (now East Drive in Central Park), a region formerly known as McGowan's Pass. According to a 1905 local history, the Fort Fish site is "at an elevation of 89 feet above tide-water," making it the highest point in the northeast quadrant of Central Park.

== See also ==
- Nutter's Battery
- Fort Clinton (Central Park)
