= North Woods and North Meadow =

Geographical features in New York City's Central Park

Coordinates: 40.7970°N 73.9577°W

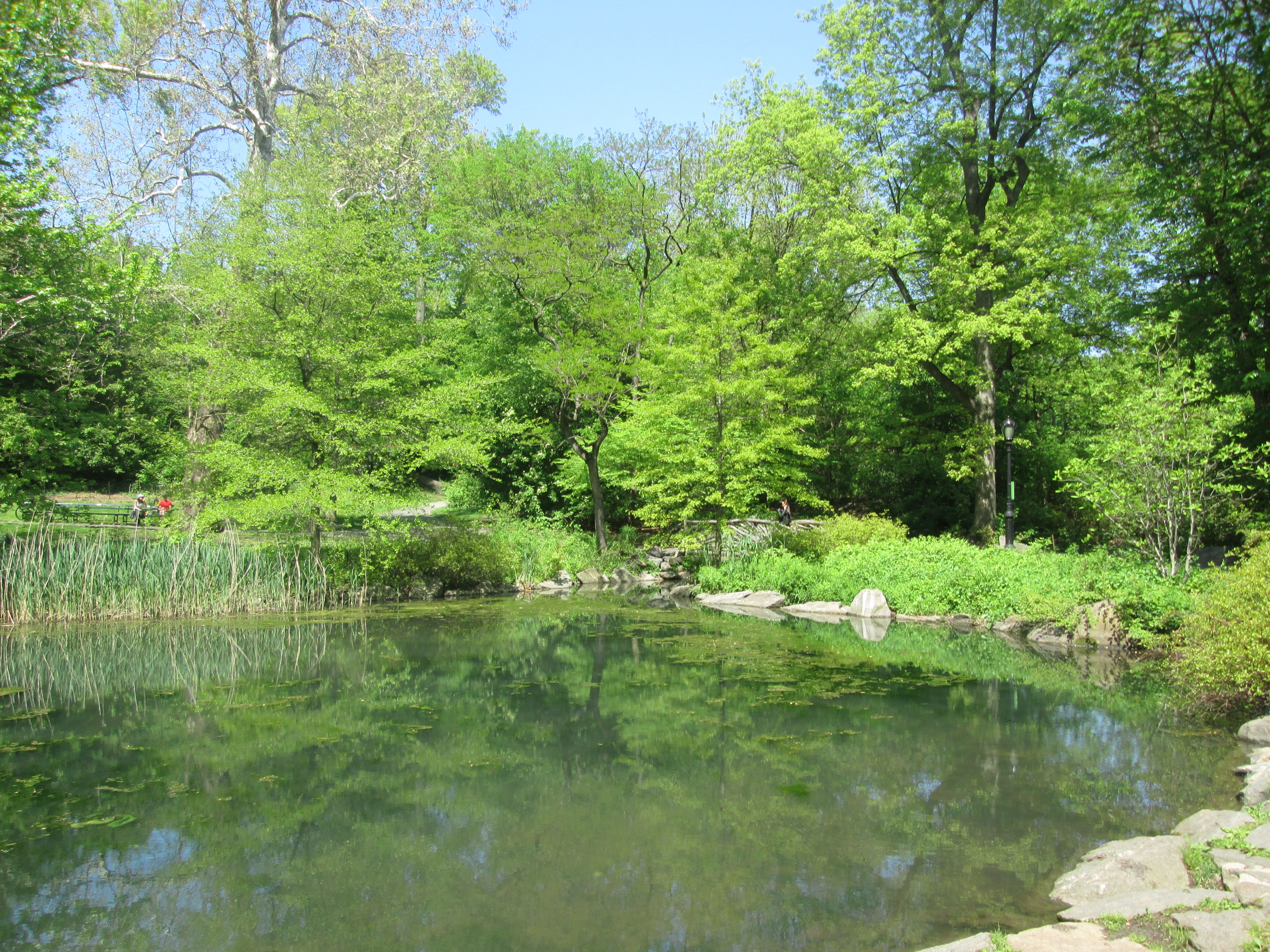
The shore of the Pool just west of the North Woods

Notable buildings and structures of Central Park. Click on the map and then on the points for details.

North Woods and North Meadow are two interconnected features in the northern section of Central Park, New York City, close to the neighborhoods of the Upper West Side and Harlem in Manhattan. The 90-acre (36 ha) North Woods, in the northwestern corner of the park, is a rugged woodland that contains a forest called the Ravine, as well as two water features called the Loch and the Pool. The western portion of the North Woods also includes Great Hill, the third highest point in Central Park. North Meadow, a recreation center and sports complex, is immediately southeast of the North Woods. Completed in the 1860s, North Woods and North Meadow were among the last parts of Central Park to be built.

== History ==
=== Construction ===
North Woods and North Meadow, located between 97th and 110th Streets in Central Park, were among the last parts of the park to be built. While construction on the southern part of the park started in 1857, the northernmost four blocks between 106th and 110th Streets were not even purchased until 1859. At the time, the northwestern corner of the park was a rocky forest, while the northeastern corner (now the Harlem Meer) was a swamp.

The Pool and Loch in the North Woods were proposed by Central Park commissioner Robert J. Dillon, who included it as one of seventeen amendments to the Greensward Plan, Frederick Law Olmsted and Calvert Vaux's original design for Central Park. Work had started on the northern section of the park by 1864, but was complicated by a need to preserve the historic McGowan's Pass on the northeastern corner of the park. The topography in the northern section of Central Park was not altered as much as that in the southern section of the park: workers created drives and paths, as well as the Pool, Loch, and Harlem Meer, but did not modify much of the landscape. North Woods and North Meadow were completed by the late 1860s.

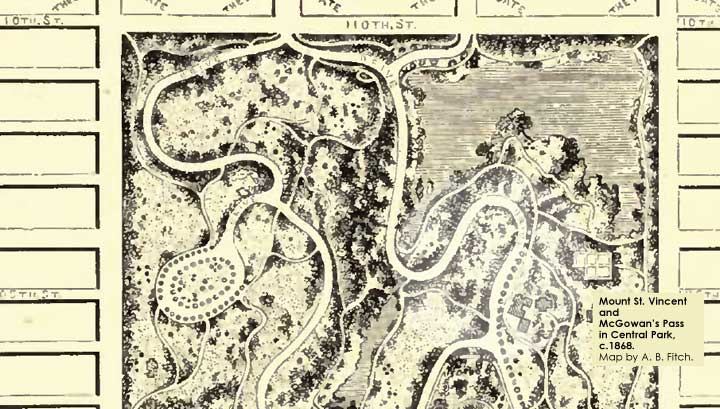
1868 map of Central Park, detail; North Woods is at left, while Harlem Meer is at top right. North Meadow can be seen at the bottom of the image.

In 1870–1871, the Tammany Hall political machine, which was the largest political force in New York at the time, took control of Central Park for a brief period. They proposed building a zoo at the site of the current North Woods, but the proposal was not implemented. Olmsted and Vaux also proposed an observation tower atop Great Hill, though this was never completed, either.

=== Late 19th and early 20th centuries ===
For the first few decades of Central Park's existence, it was forbidden to play most sports in Central Park, because Olmsted and Vaux believed that the park should be used for scenic enjoyment rather than recreation. However, because of growing recreational pressures, the Central Park commission opened North Meadow to sports by the late 19th century. The first recorded cricket matches were played in North Meadow by 1885, and immigrant families began hosting picnics in North Meadow by the 1920s. In addition, there was a proposal to move the Central Park Zoo to the North Meadow in the 1890s, though this was controversial and largely opposed. In 1902, the Interborough Rapid Transit Company excavated a subway tunnel at a deep level underneath the Great Hill, North Woods and North Meadow, as part of its Lenox Avenue Line (present-day 2 and 3 trains).

In 1910, in conjunction with Central Park's growing recreational use, New York City Board of Aldermen president John Purroy Mitchel suggested placing a swimming pool and recreational center in the North Meadow. However, parks commissioner Charles Stover opposed the plan, and it was ultimately dropped. After the plan was cancelled, another proposal was made that would replace the "comfort station", refreshment stand, and storage shed in North Meadow with a single recreational center. Around this time, in 1911, North Meadow was temporarily closed for reseeding, to mitigate damage caused by heavy usage. During the project, North Meadow was fenced in, and new trees and shrubs were added. The work took about four years.

Another plan in the 1920s called for a playground in the northern section of Central Park, near the North Woods. Ultimately, the West 110th Street Playground was built at the site. Under NYC Parks commissioner Robert Moses, athletic fields were constructed in the North Meadow in the 1930s, and bocce, tennis, and volleyball facilities for adults were installed in the Great Hill. The North Meadow was thus designated as an adults' play area, while the Great Lawn further south was reserved for children.

In 1962, the city announced that Lasker Rink would be built above the mouth of the Loch. When completed in 1966, the facility served as an ice rink in winter and Central Park's only swimming pool in summer.

=== Restoration ===
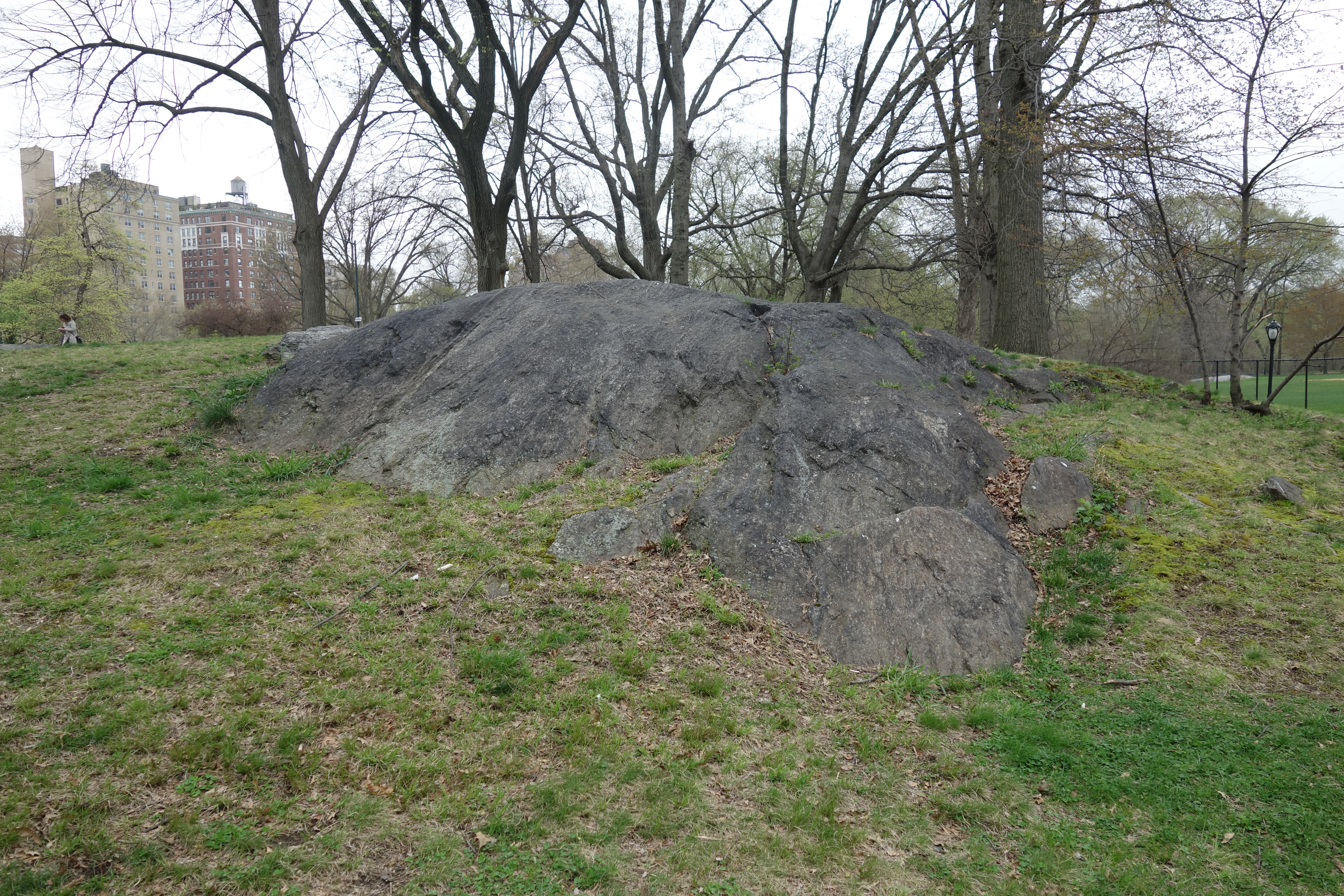
A rock in North Meadow

By the late 1960s, the Loch had deteriorated to such an extent that the cascades along its route had dried up, and the stream was jokingly referred to as "the Trickle". The Great Hill was also rundown, as was the North Woods. By 1987, the Central Park Conservancy had raised $2.5 million to build a tennis house, the current recreation center, in the North Meadow. However, these plans were opposed by some tennis players, who stated that the existing tennis house on the southern edge of the meadow was located on a hill that afforded better views of the surrounding area, while the proposed tennis house would be located in a depression.

The area gained notoriety in April 1989 due to the Central Park jogger case. A white female jogger was badly beaten and raped at night in the North Woods, when 30-32 youths from East Harlem were known to have been roaming through the park, and accosting and sometimes assaulting eight other persons. According to The New York Times, the attack was "one of the most widely publicized crimes of the 1980s". A group of four black and one Hispanic teenagers, who became known as the "Central Park Five", were convicted of this and another assault, and sentenced to years in prison. Their convictions were vacated after another man confessed to the crime in 2002, his DNA matched that found in semen at the scene, and the DA's office conducted an investigation of other elements of the evidence.

Following the female jogger attack and other assaults in the park that night, the Central Park Conservancy organized the Citizens Task Force on the Use and Security of Central Park. The task force published a report that suggested reverting the North Meadow's baseball fields to a lawn, though this was strongly opposed by athletes who used these ball fields. In 1990, the Conservancy announced recreational programs and restoration projects to attract more people to the North Woods and, by extension, reduce crime. Improvements to the northern end of the park began around this time. Areas of the North Woods was cleared and replanted, and programs to minimize erosion were set up. In 1994, the Conservancy announced a $71.5 million program to restore several portions of the park. The projects included adding drainage systems and reseeding the North Woods and North Meadow. The North Meadow Recreation Center was renovated again from 1998 to 2000.

The West 110th Street playground was restored in 2006. A major storm destroyed more than one hundred trees in the northern section of the park in 2009, which represented the single greatest loss to the park's trees in thirty years. JPMorgan Chase later donated $1 million to replace the trees.

A $150 million renovation of Lasker Rink was officially announced in 2018, requiring that the rink be closed between late 2021 and 2024. As part of the plan, the portion of the Loch and Harlem Meer under the lake would be restored to a more natural state, and a boardwalk would be added along the newly restored Loch. A new rink would be built to the east of the Loch and would be set within a slope, containing a new pool that would be located at a lower elevation than the existing pool. During winters, ice skaters would be allowed to skate on the boardwalk and the Loch by means of synthetic ice placed on the boardwalk.

== North Woods ==
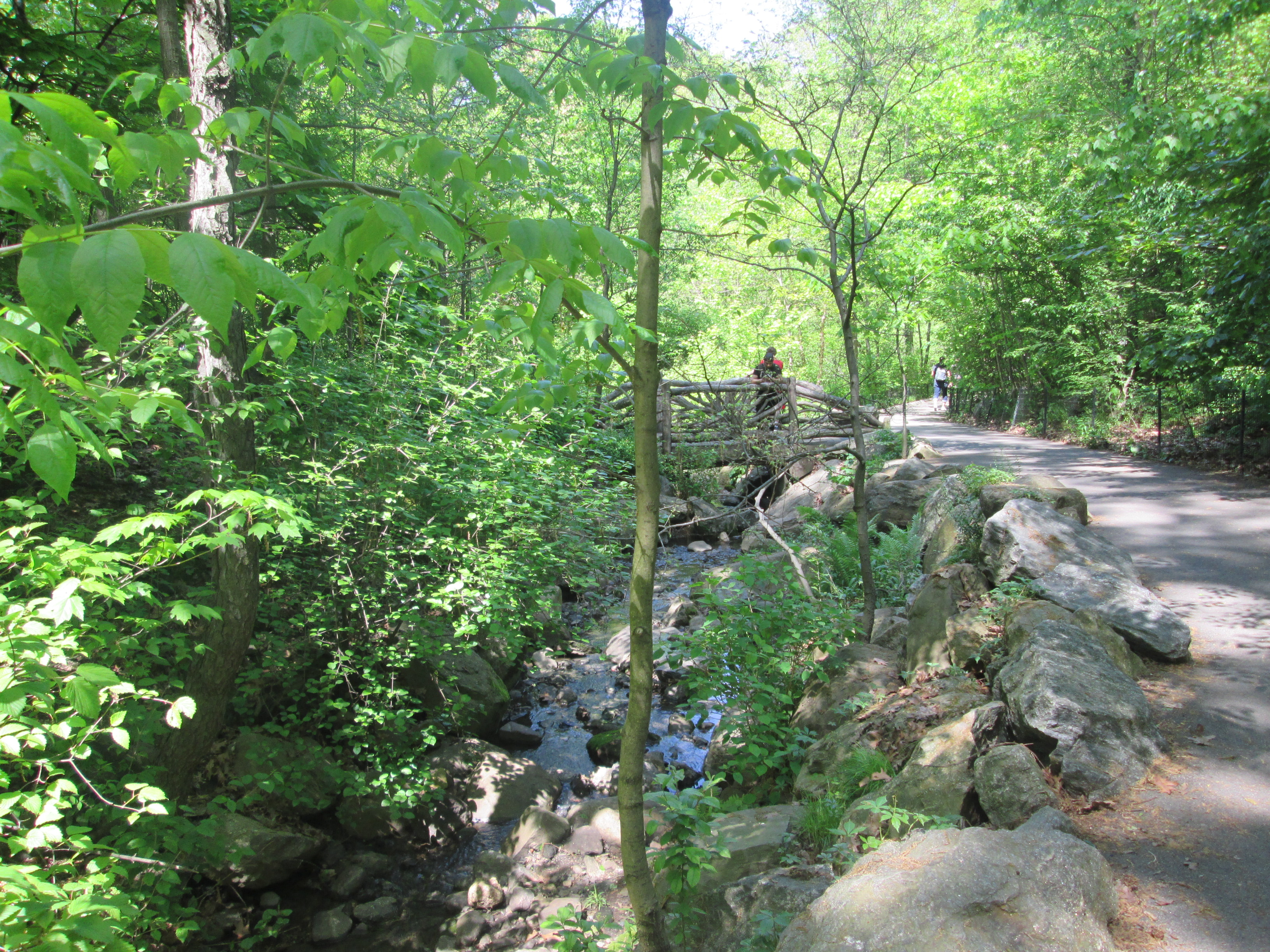
A path in North Woods

North Woods is the largest of Central Park's three woodlands, and is located at the lightly-used northwestern corner of Central Park. It covers about 90 acres (36 ha) adjacent to North Meadow. The name sometimes also applies to other attractions in the park's northern end; if these adjacent features are included, the area of North Woods can be 200 acres (81 ha). North Woods contains the 55-acre (22 ha) Ravine, a forest with deciduous trees on its northwestern slope, as well as the Loch, a small stream that winds through North Woods diagonally. The southeastern part of the Ravine contains oak, elms, and maple trees, while the area further east contains oak, hickory, maple, and ash trees. The Woods also includes Blockhouse No. 1, a historic fortification from the War of 1812.

The northwestern corner contains a playground called West 110th Street Playground. The playground has a children's play structure as well as spray fountains. The surrounding area also contains several tall rocks, popular among boulderers.

=== Great Hill ===
The western portion of North Woods contains Great Hill, the third-highest point in Central Park, rising to 135 feet (41 m) above sea level. Great Hill contains a picnic area with tables. Near the top of the hill, a 0.25-mile (0.40 km) walking path encircles a green lawn.

== North Meadow ==
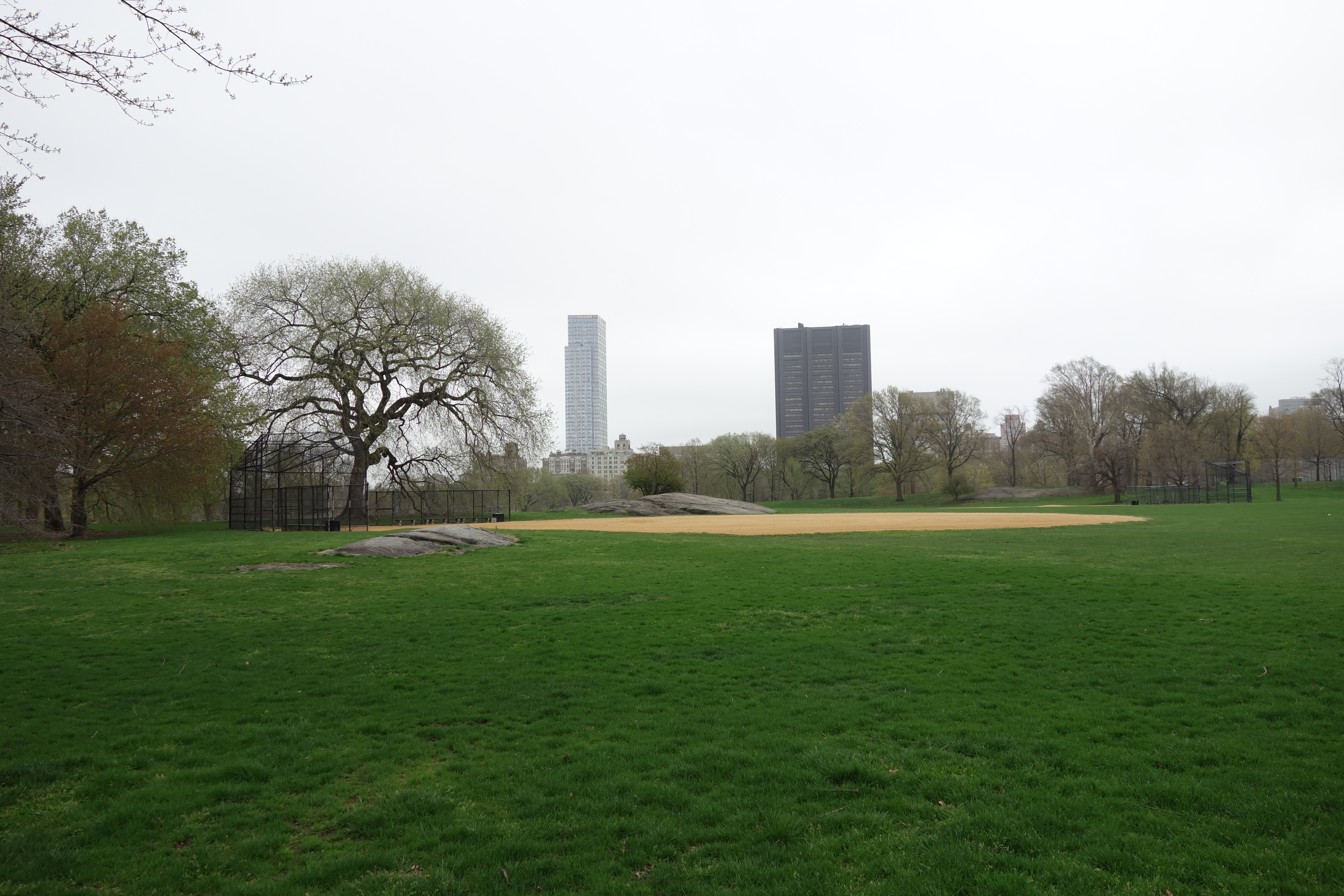
North Meadow baseball fields

North Meadow, one of Central Park's lawns, measures 23 acres (9.3 ha) and is bounded by North Woods (at approximately 102nd Street) to the north and west, Harlem Meer to the northeast, East Meadow to the east, and Jacqueline Kennedy Onassis Reservoir to the south. Samuel Parsons, the superintendent of Central Park during the 1880s through 1910s, once wrote of the North Meadow: "It is genuine park scenery that the eye is tempted to linger upon and the foot to walk upon, and presents, if viewed as a single feature, one of the best examples we have of good park work." North Meadow contains twelve baseball fields, as well as six non-regulation soccer fields overlapping with the North Meadow ballfields. A series of butterfly gardens are also located on the northeastern edge of North Meadow. The space has sometimes been used for concerts, such as Garth Brooks's 1997 event Garth: Live from Central Park, which drew an estimated crowd of up to 980,000.

In the middle of North Meadow is the North Meadow Recreation Center. The main building in the complex was converted to a recreation facility in the 1990s. The building contains twelve tennis courts and four basketball courts outdoors. In addition, a rock-climbing wall is located inside the recreation center building. In 2007, the center started offering horseback riding in conjunction with the Riverdale Equestrian Center, which operates near Van Cortlandt Park in the Bronx. Additionally, the North Meadow includes a security center, installed in 1984.

== The Pool and Loch ==
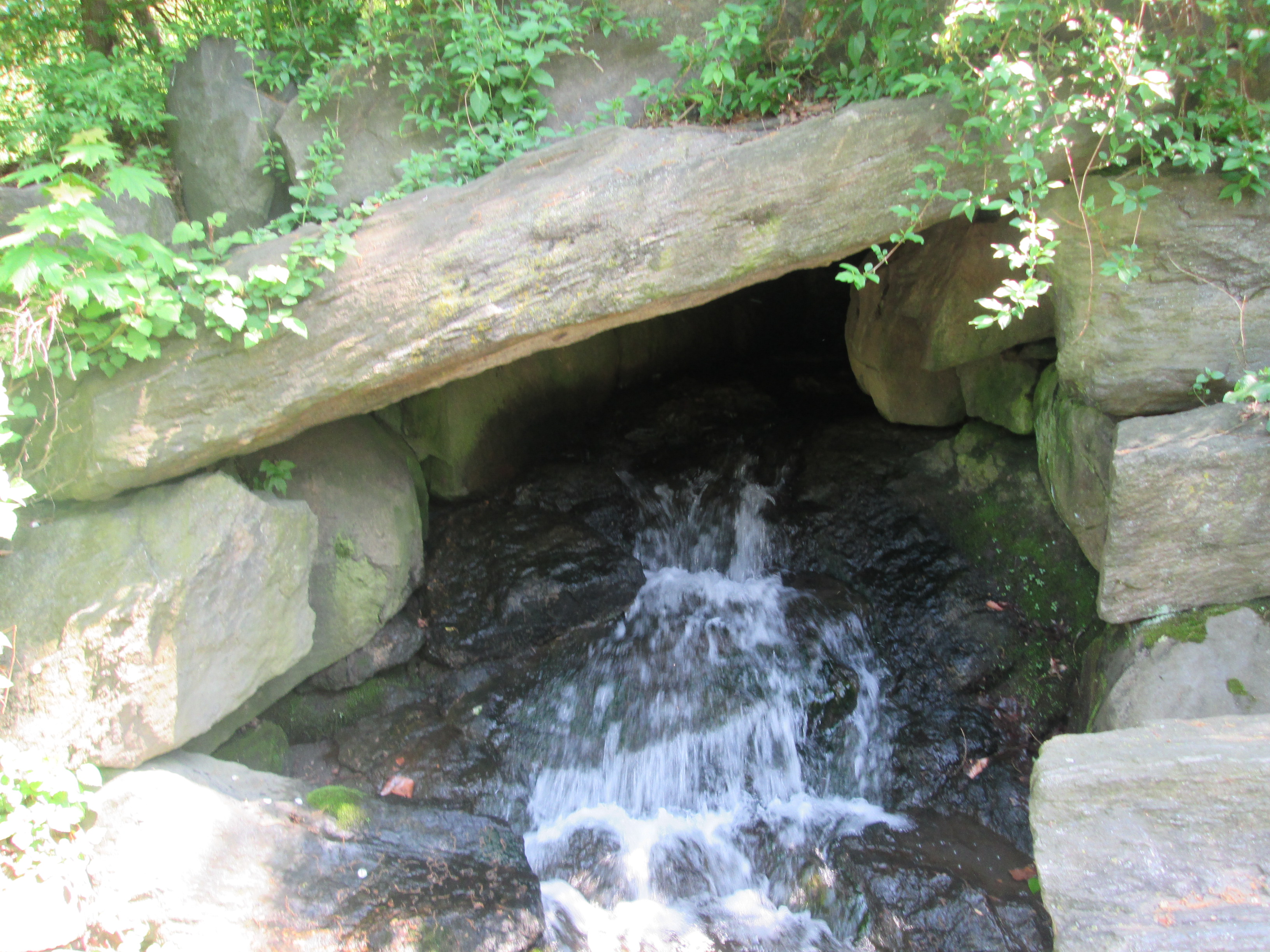
This grotto is the Pool's source.

North Woods contains the Loch, which drains into Harlem Meer in the northeastern corner of the park; the Loch is fed by the Pool, whose mouth is the waterfall at its eastern end that is the source of the Loch, just west of the arch called Glen Span. The Loch and Pool are adapted from a single watercourse called Montayne's Rivulet, originally fed from a natural spring but now replenished by the city's water system. The Loch is the only stream in Central Park where an existing watercourse was left aboveground, rather than placed in a culvert underground.

The Pool is located near 101st Street and Central Park West. It was once surrounded by lilies and contained a rocky island in the center. The water for the Pool comes from a grotto that hides a 48-inch (120 cm) water supply pipe. Originally, the Pool was fed by a drainage basin of 64.5 acres (26.1 ha) inside the park as well as 115 acres (47 ha) to the west of the park boundary.

The Loch originates at the Pool before winding through the North Woods and the Ravine. Its name is likely influenced from the trips that Central Park designer Frederick Law Olmsted made to the United Kingdom during the 1850s. The Loch, formerly an actual lake, was whittled down over time into a small stream. Originally, there were two waterfalls on the Loch: a 13.5 ft (4.1 m) drop at the Pool, and a smaller 9.5 ft (2.9 m) drop further east. Paths also lined either bank of the Loch. A diverse selection of plant species was located along the Loch, though before the 1990s restoration, this had been reduced to a few invasive species. The Loch then travels under the Huddlestone Arch, passing by the Davis Center to the east before draining into the Harlem Meer. Prior to the reconstruction of the area in the early 2020s, the stream originally ran through a culvert under the previous Lasker Rink facility before emptying into the Meer. The tall-grass meadow adjacent to the Loch is the park's only woodland meadow.

The Pool

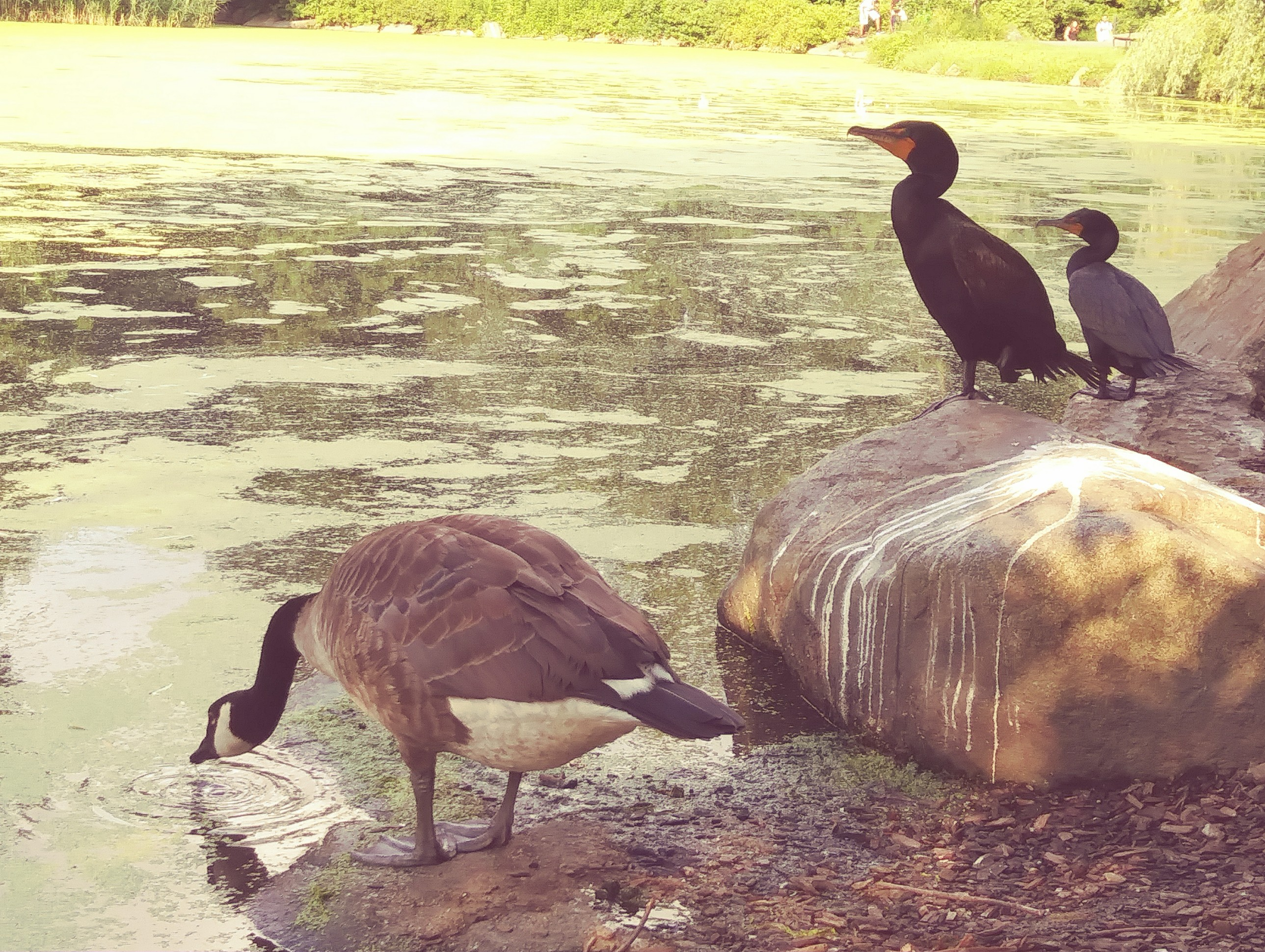
The Pool: Canada goose, cormorants

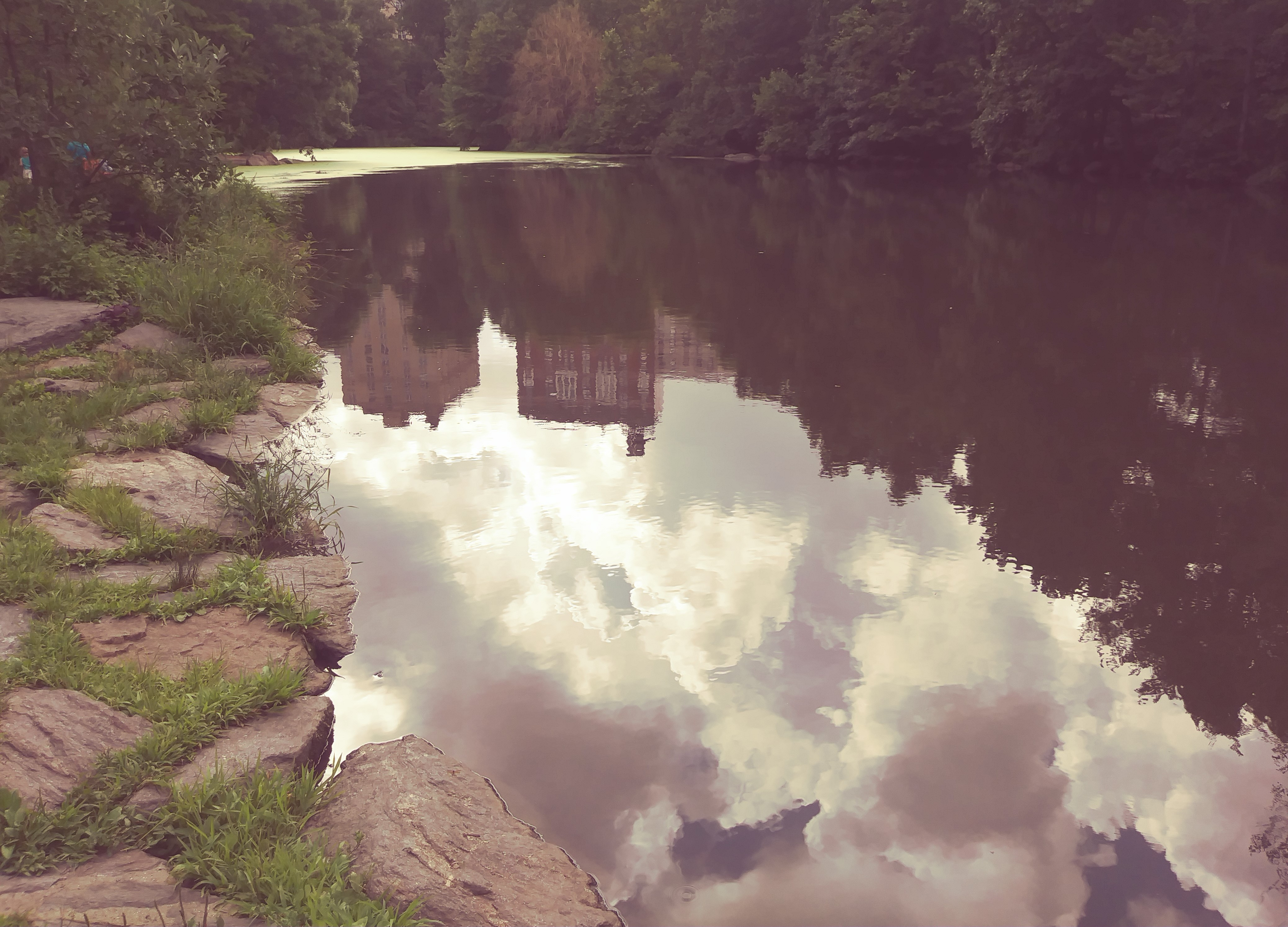
View looking west across the Pool

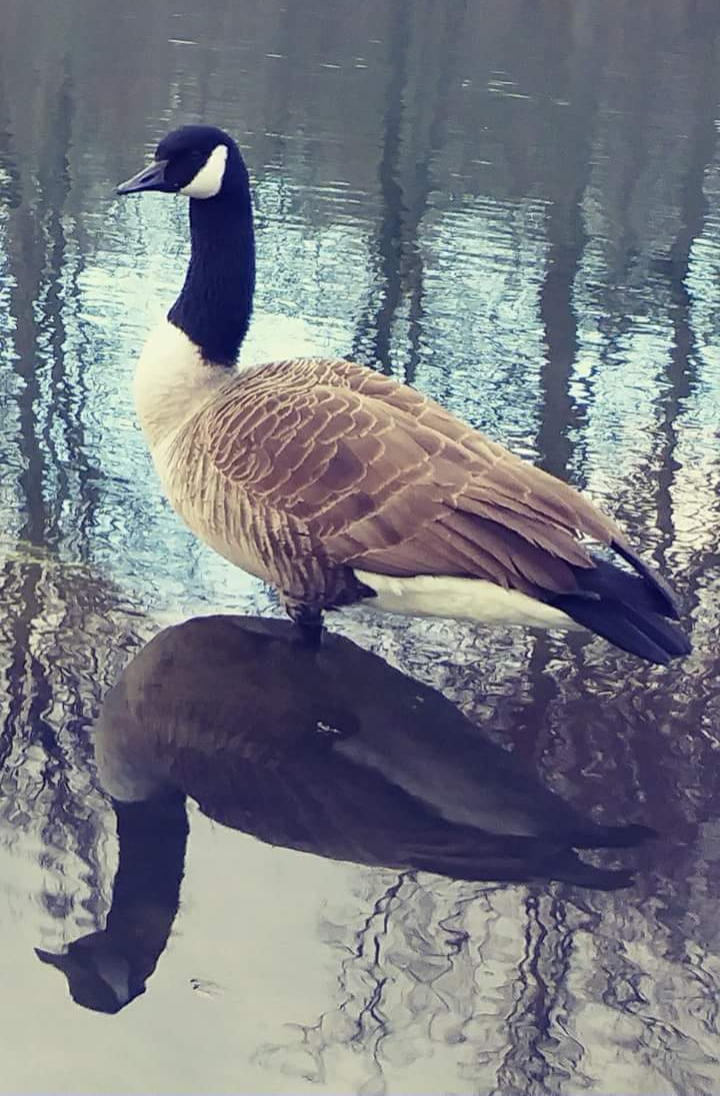
Canada goose in the Pool

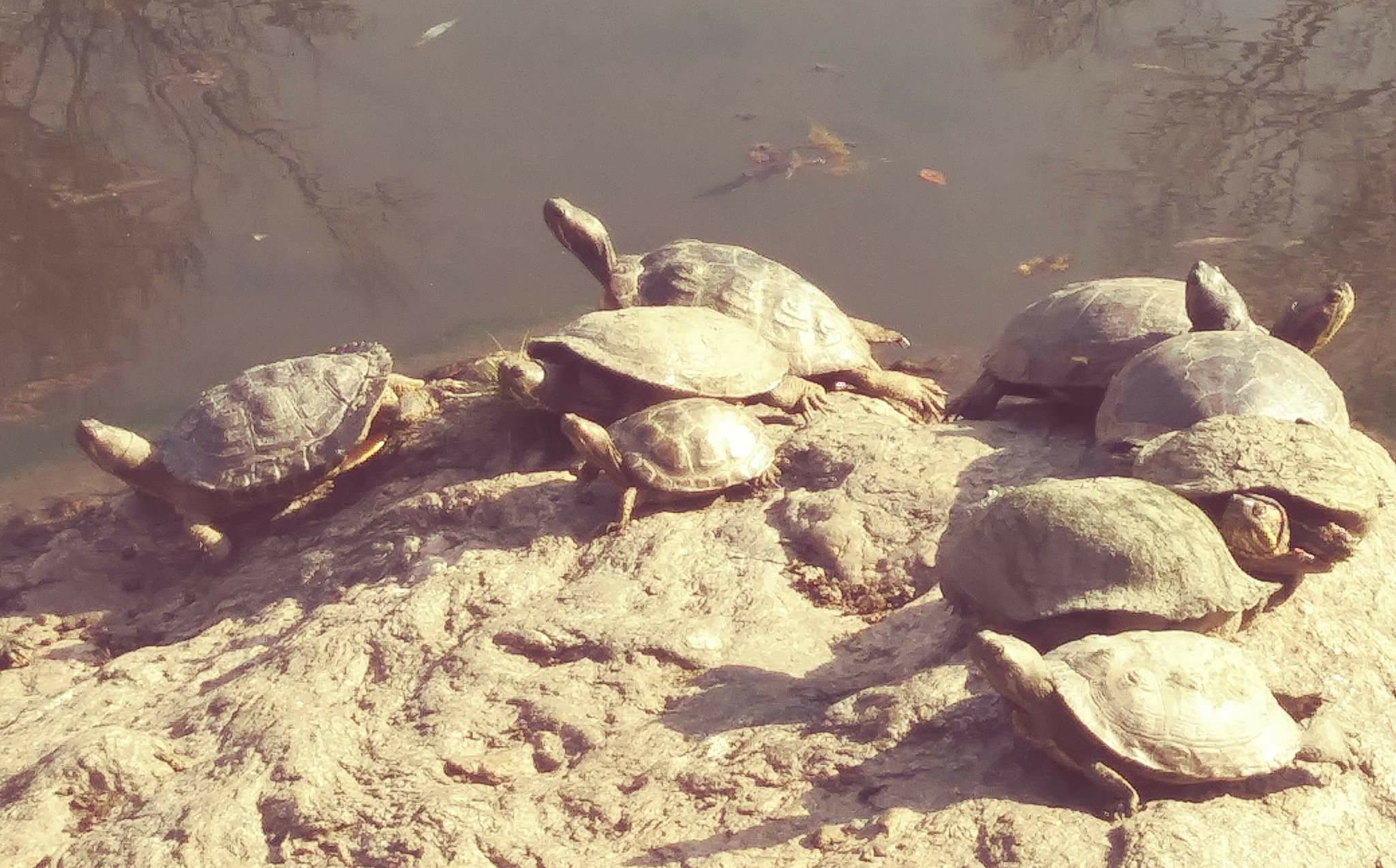
Turtles sunbathing on a rock in the Pool

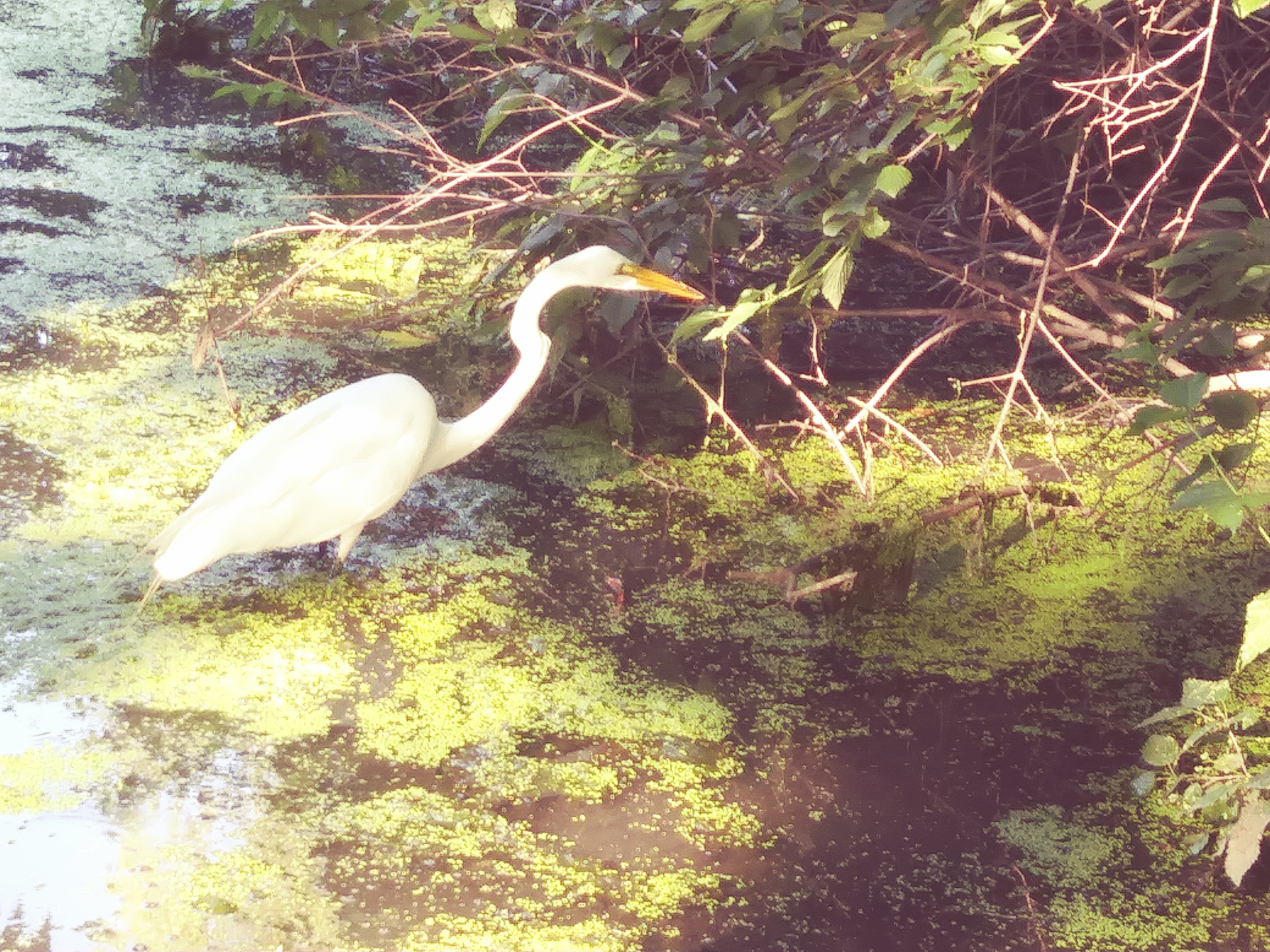
Egret in the Pool

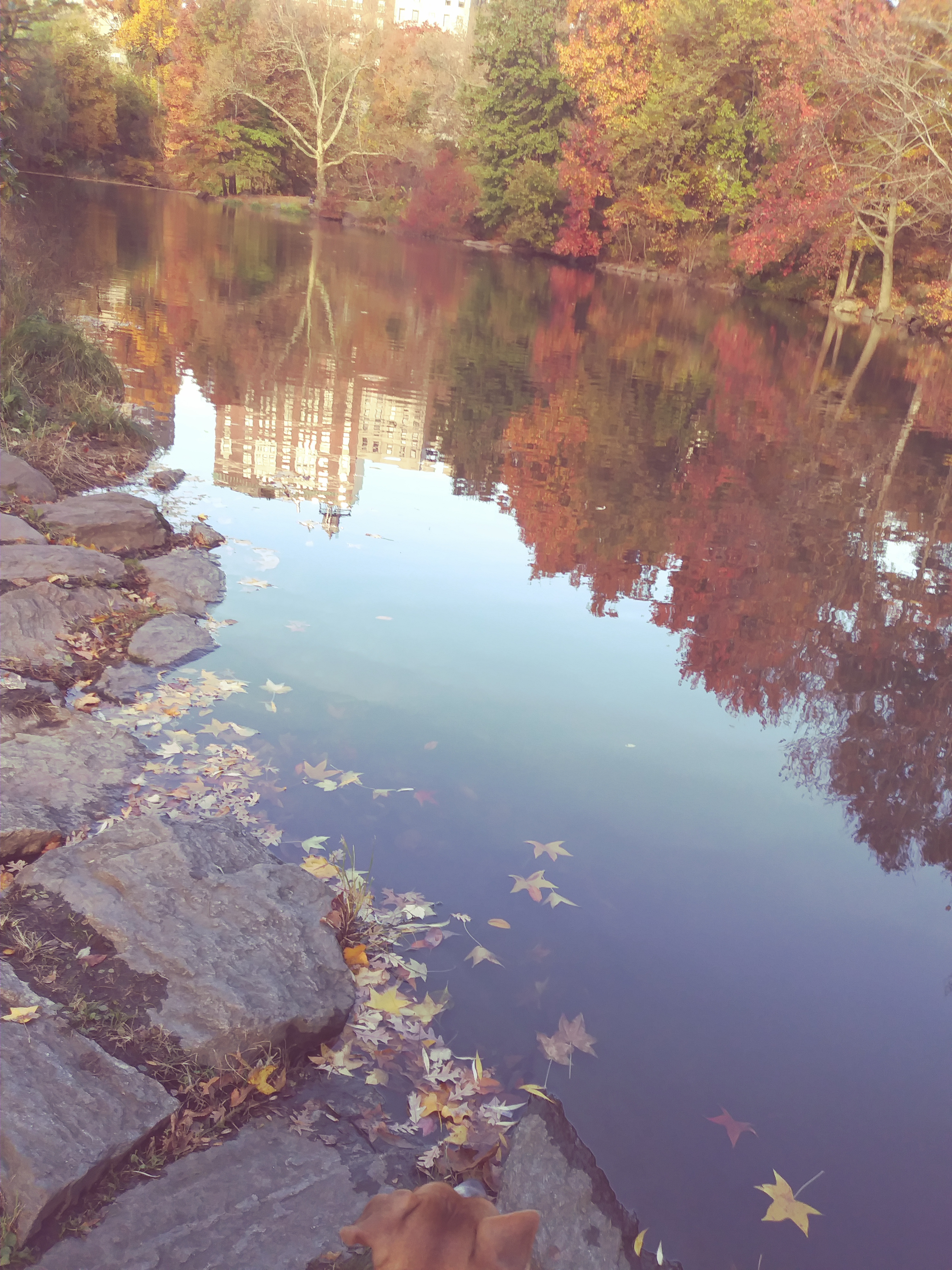
November morning

The Loch

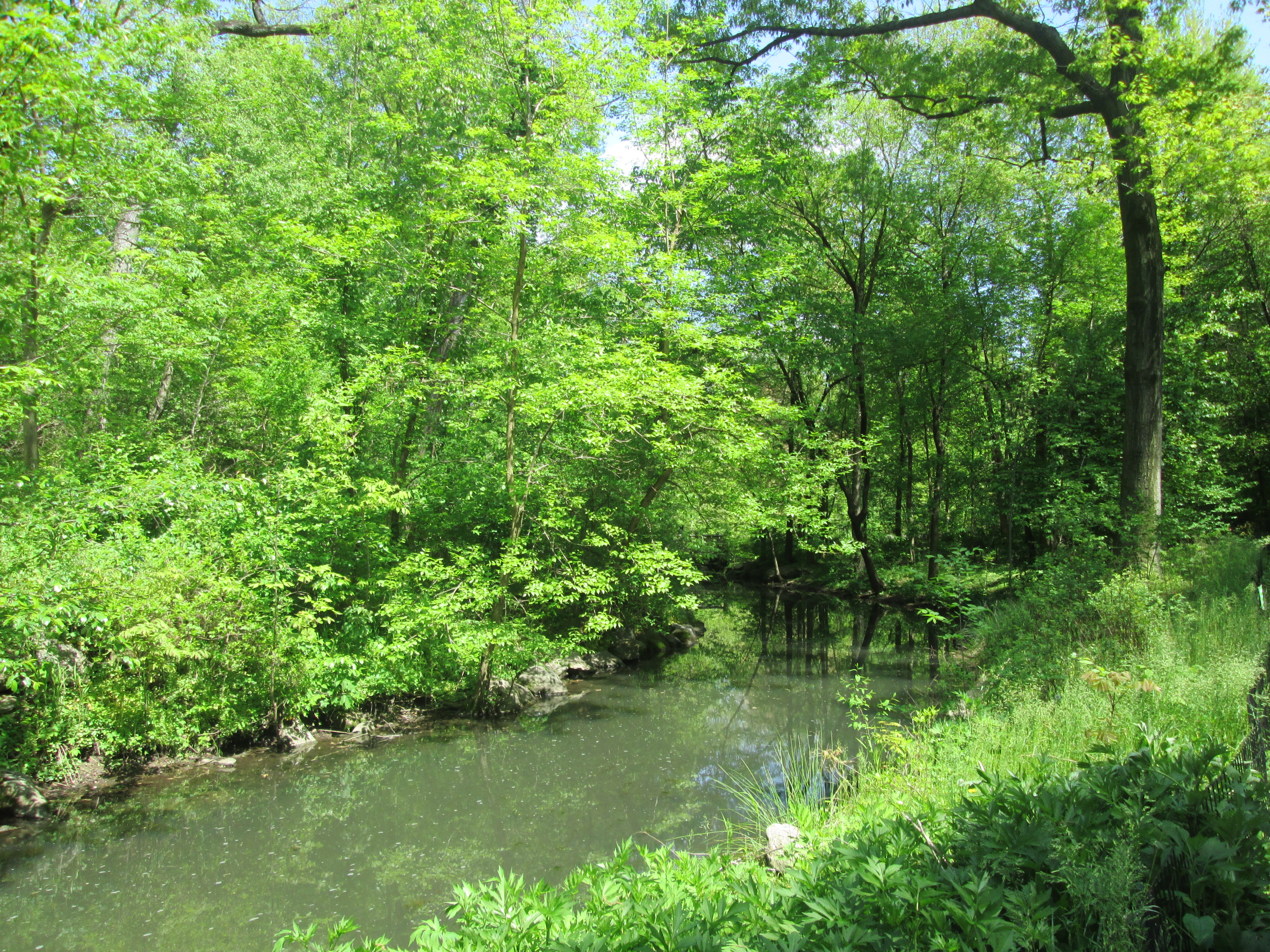
The Loch parallels a footpath to the east

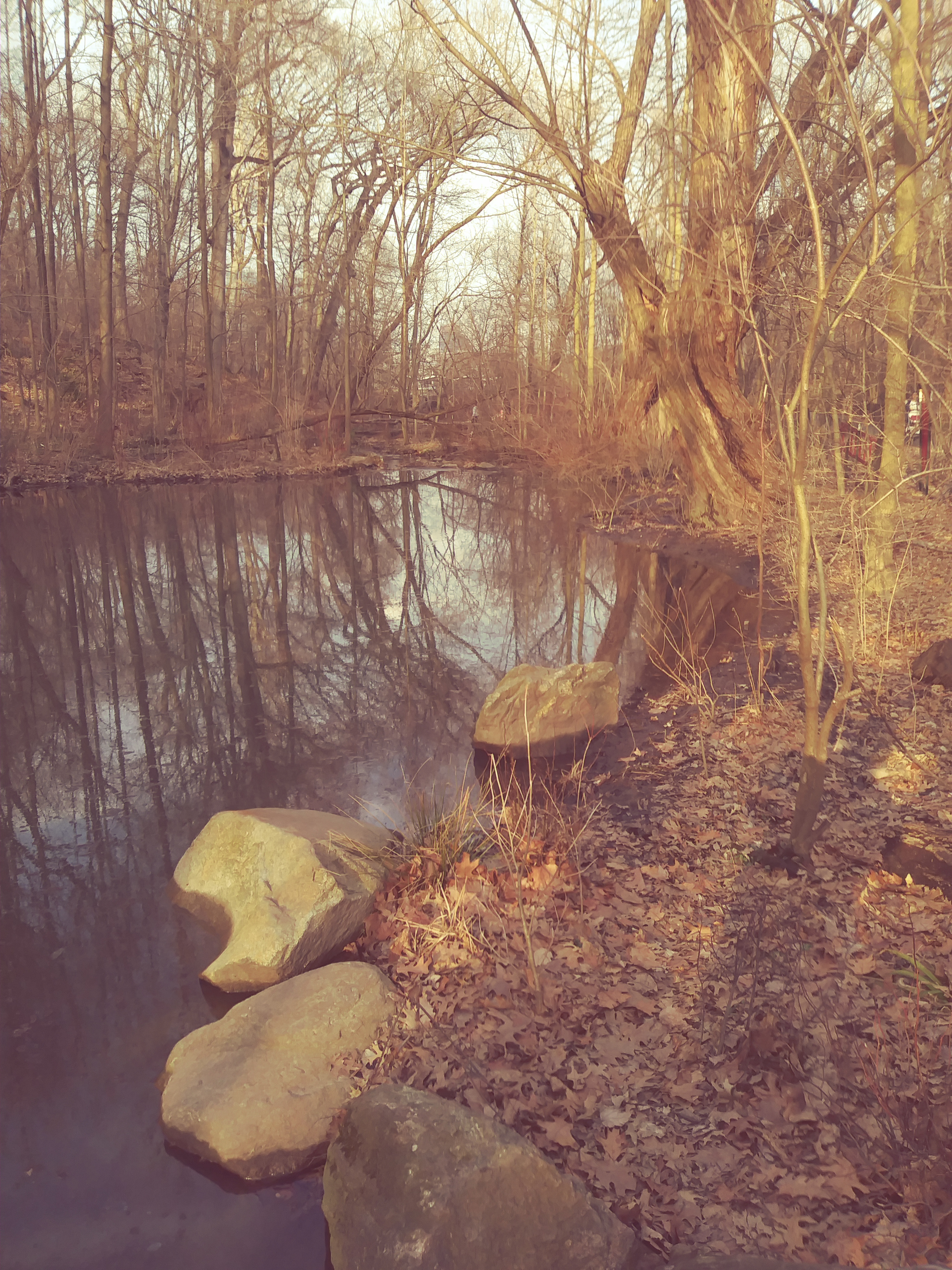
Seen in March

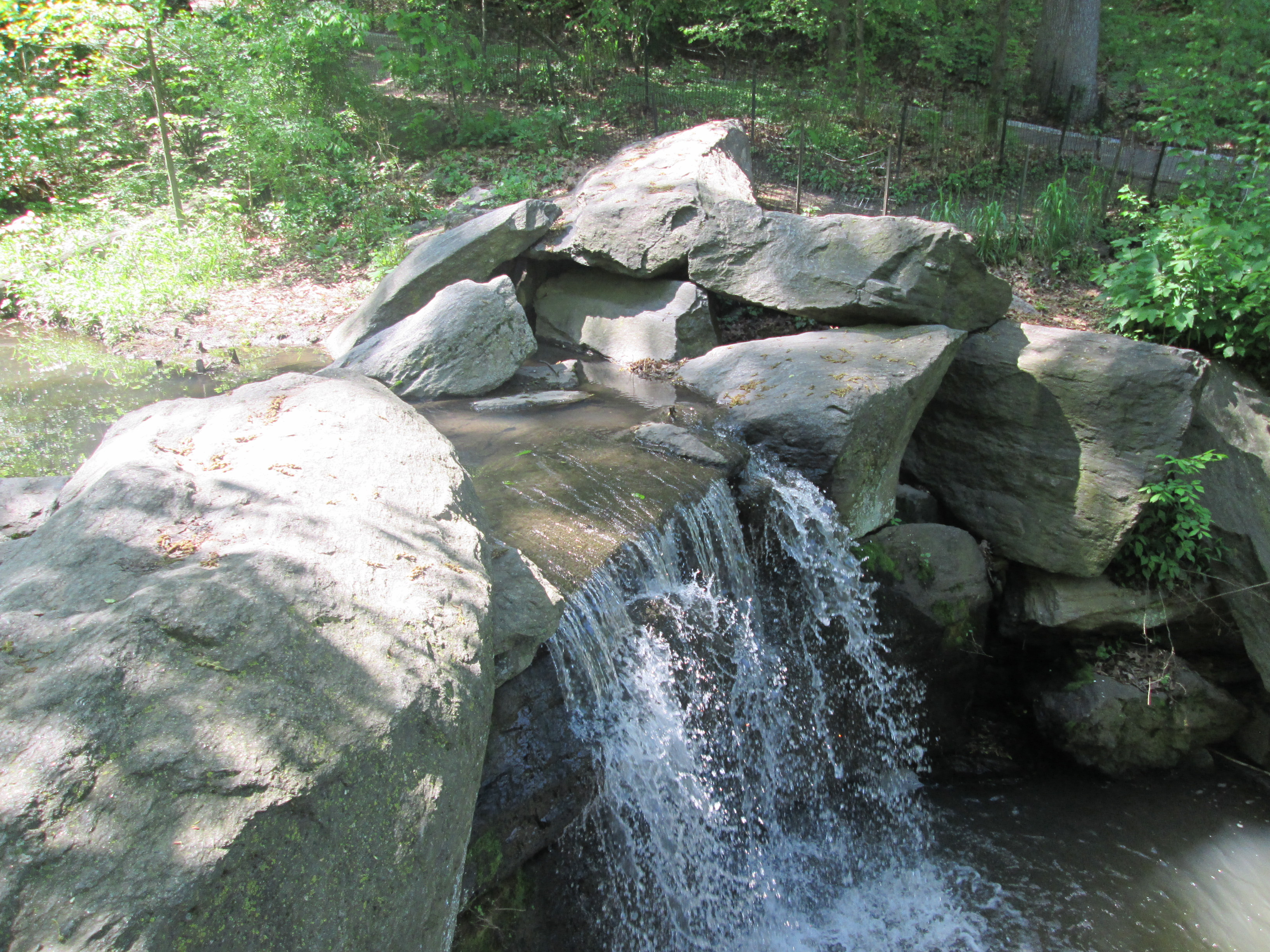
A small cascade in the Loch

== Bridges ==
North Woods contains four ornamental spans. Glen Span, a light-gray gneiss-and-ashlar span, crosses the Loch as well as the adjacent walkway. Further east, Huddlestone Arch carries the East Drive above a pedestrian path and the Loch. It is made of boulders, some weighing nearly 100 short tons (89 long tons; 91 tonnes). It is the only one in the park whose boulders are held together solely by gravity. South of both of those, the Springbanks Arch carries a bridle path and a former segment of carriage road across a pedestrian path and a stream of the Loch. Finally, the gneiss-and-ashlar Mountcliff Arch, near the Frederick Douglass Circle entrance to the park at 110th Street and Eighth Avenue, is the tallest span in the park at 48 feet (15 m) high. In addition, there are three unadorned "rustic bridges" in North Woods: the Cascade and Loch Bridges, as well as a third unnamed bridge.

Ornamental bridges of North Woods

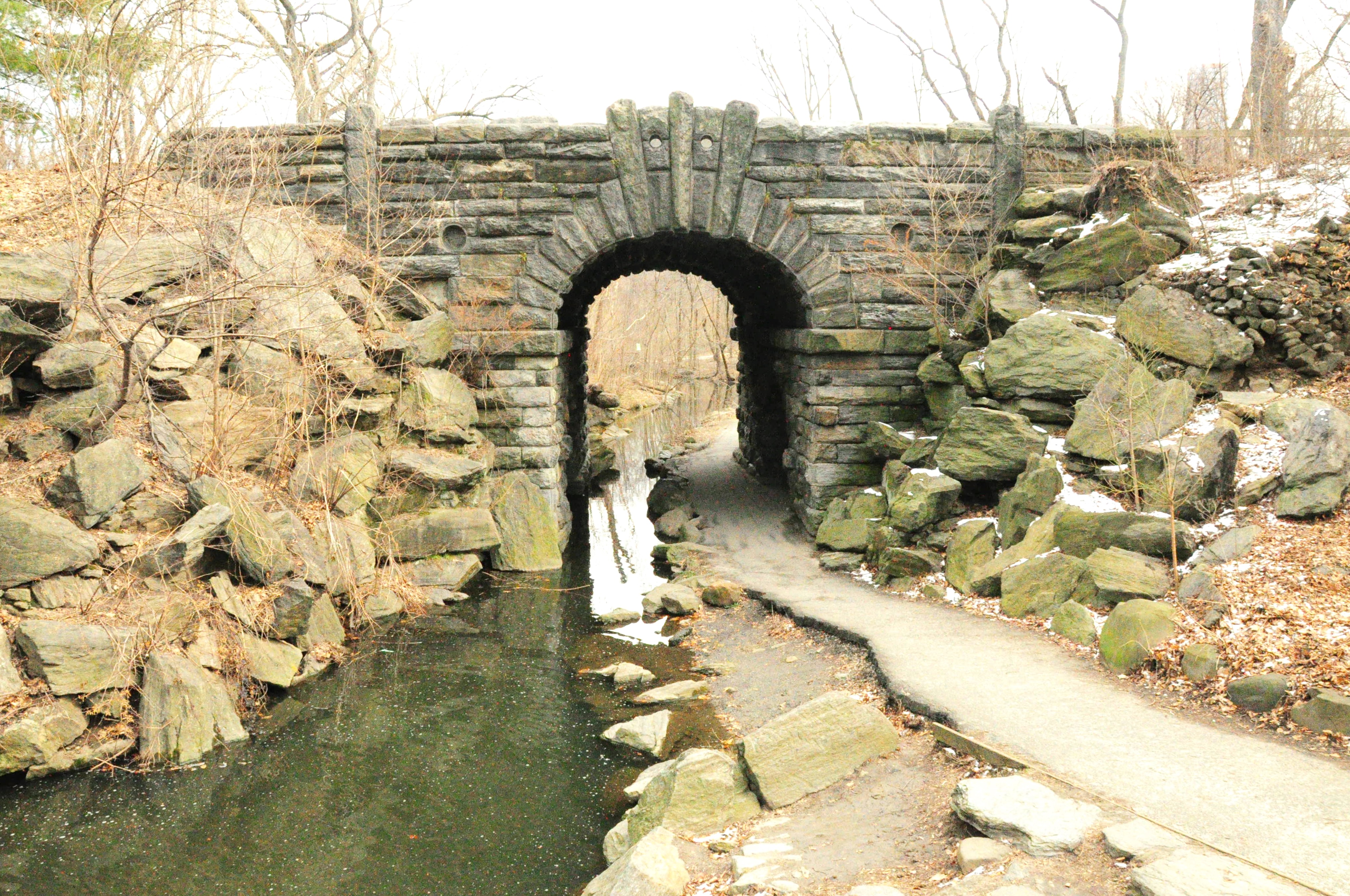
Glen Span

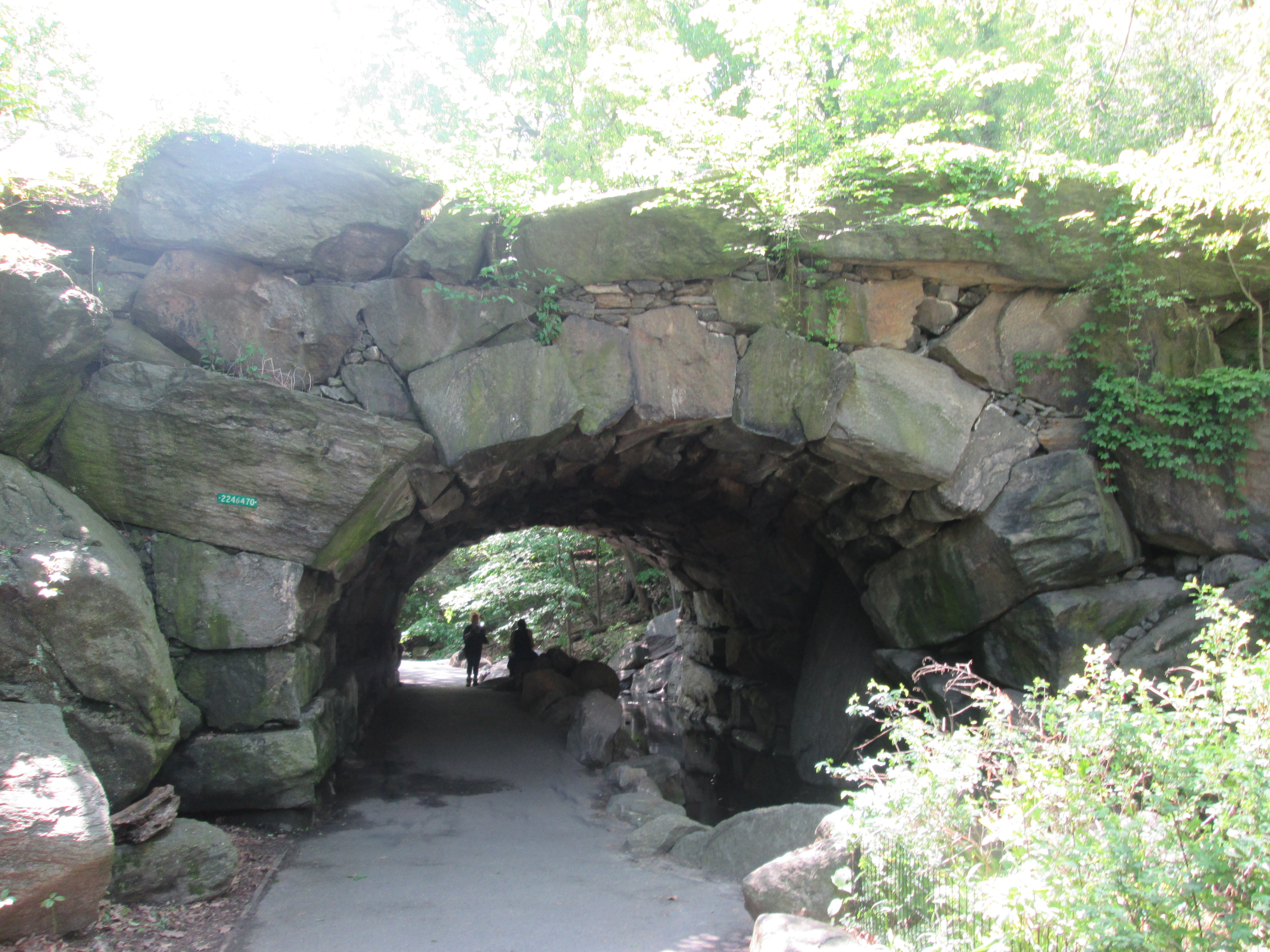
Huddlestone Arch

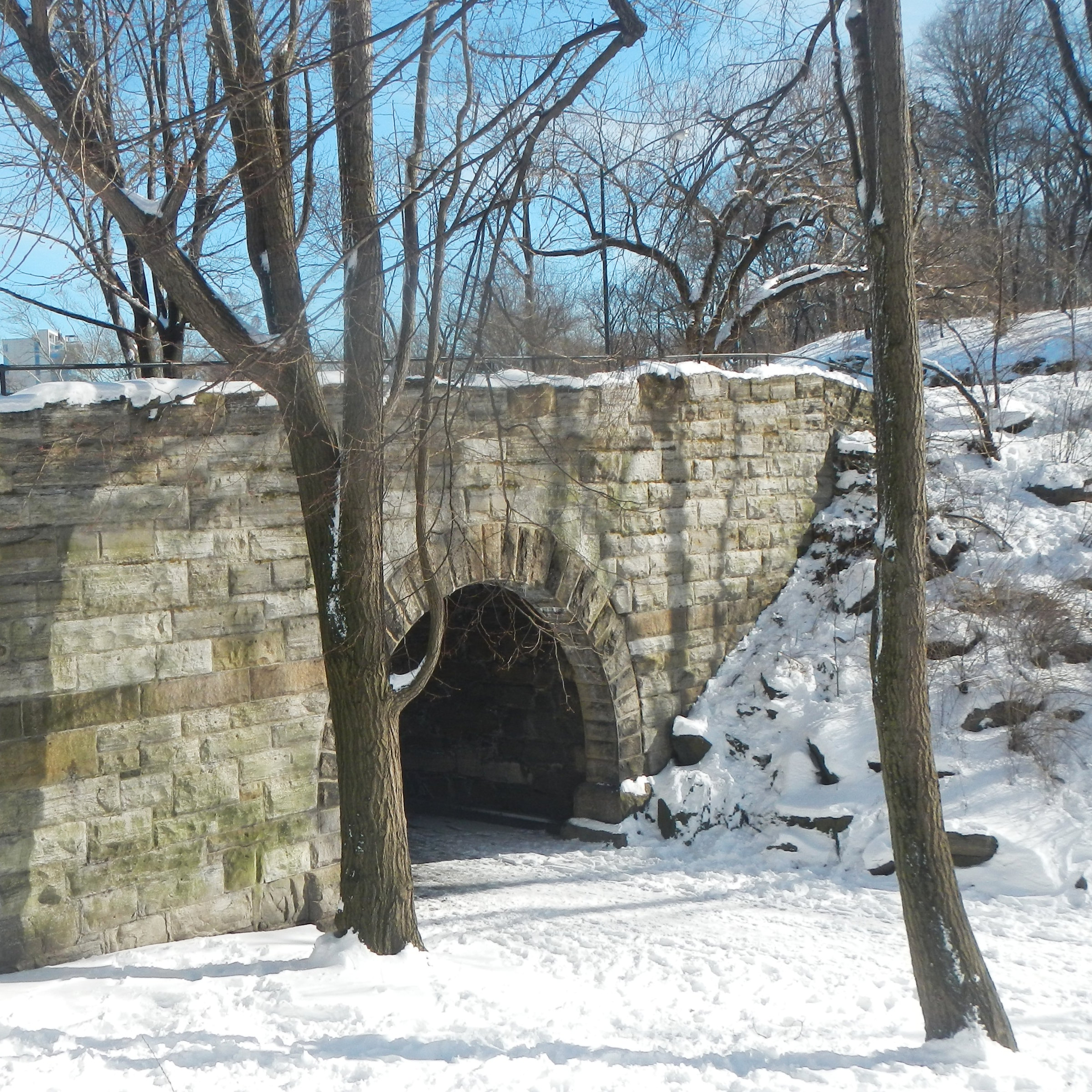
Mountcliff Arch

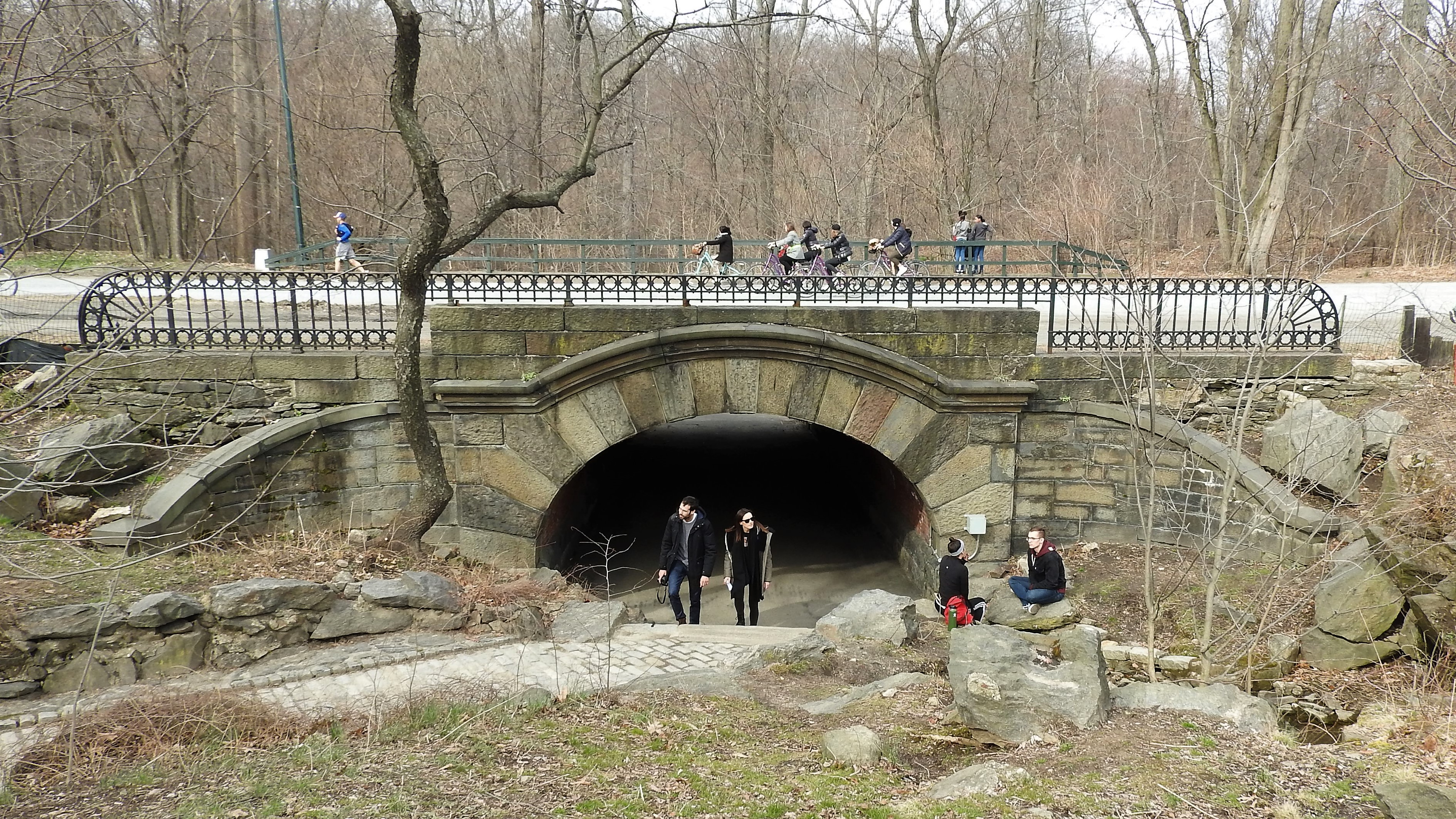
Springbanks Arch
