= Fort Clinton (Central Park) =

Former fort in New York City's Central Park

Coordinates: 40°47′43″N 73°57′8″W

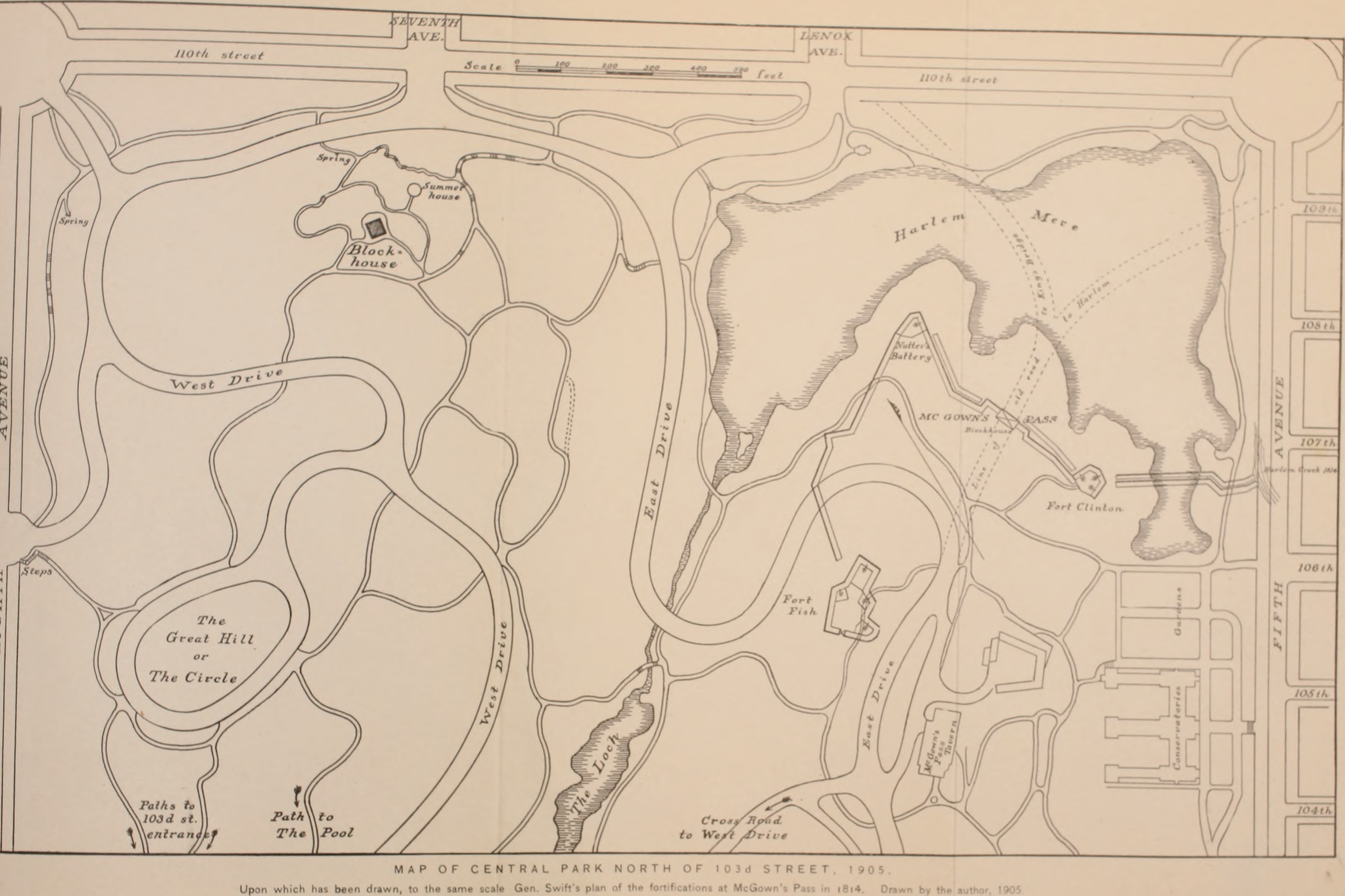
Forts of northern Central Park

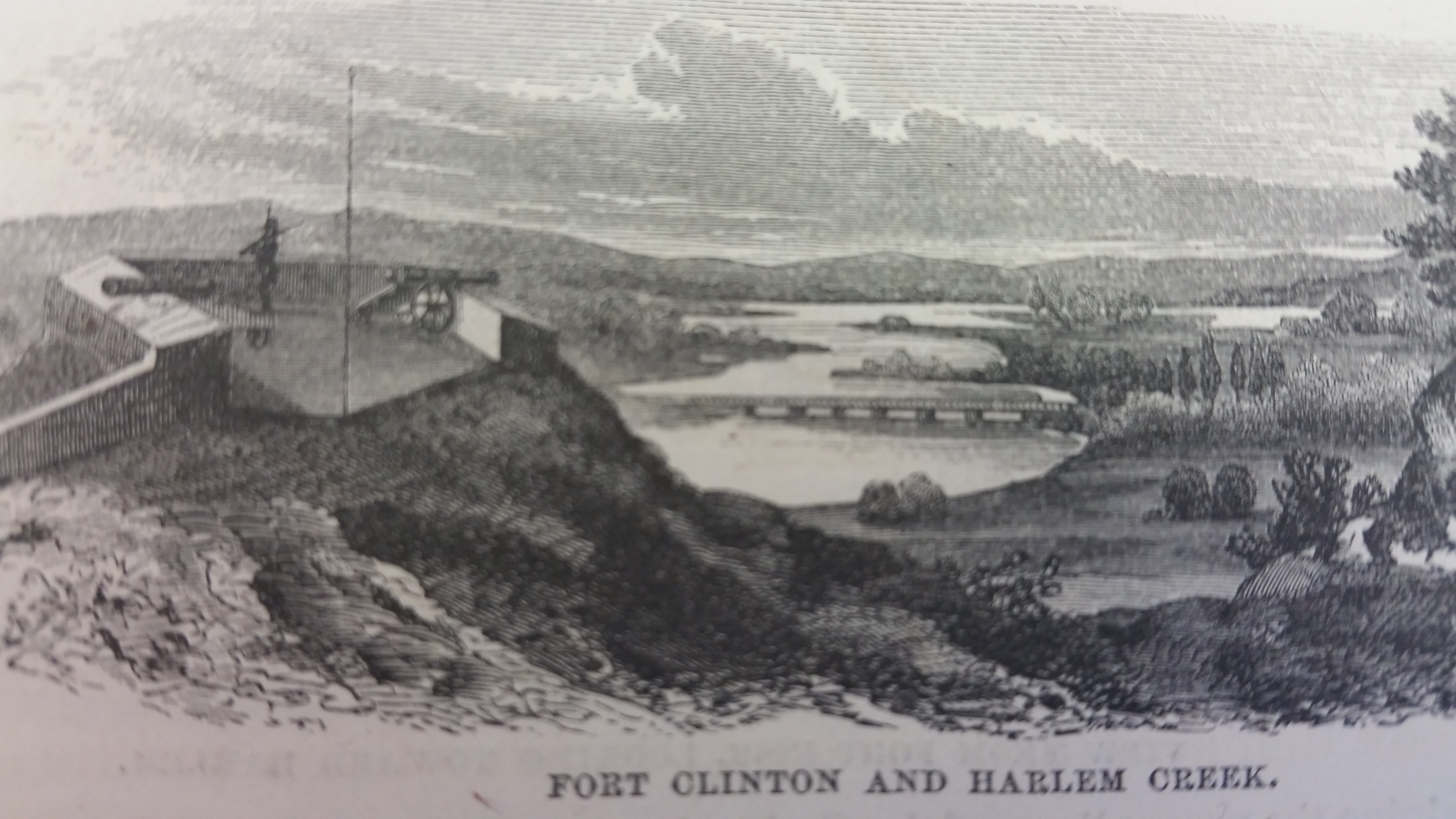
Fort Clinton

Notable buildings and structures of Central Park. Click on the map and then on the points for details.

Fort Clinton was a stone-and-earthworks fortification on an elevation within what is now Central Park in New York City. It was built in 1814 near the present line of 107th Street, slightly west of Fifth Avenue. According to maps of the time, Fort Clinton was the easternmost of a connected series of forts, connected to Nutter's Battery on the west by earthworks and a gatehouse over the Old Post Road at the bottom of McGowan's Pass. Fort Clinton and Nutter's Battery were commanded from a third fort at the top of the pass, Fort Fish, which had a sweeping view of Long Island Sound, northern Manhattan, and Westchester County. Fort Fish was across the road from Fort Clinton and connected to Nutter's Battery by another line of earthworks.

The fort was named after DeWitt Clinton, a mayor of New York City.

Previously, during the American Revolution, the site had been a redoubt used by British and Hessian soldiers to protect McGowan's Pass during their occupation of New York City from 1776 to 1783.

A memorial consisting of a commemorative plaque and two cannons surrounded by benches and a flagpole now occupies the site.

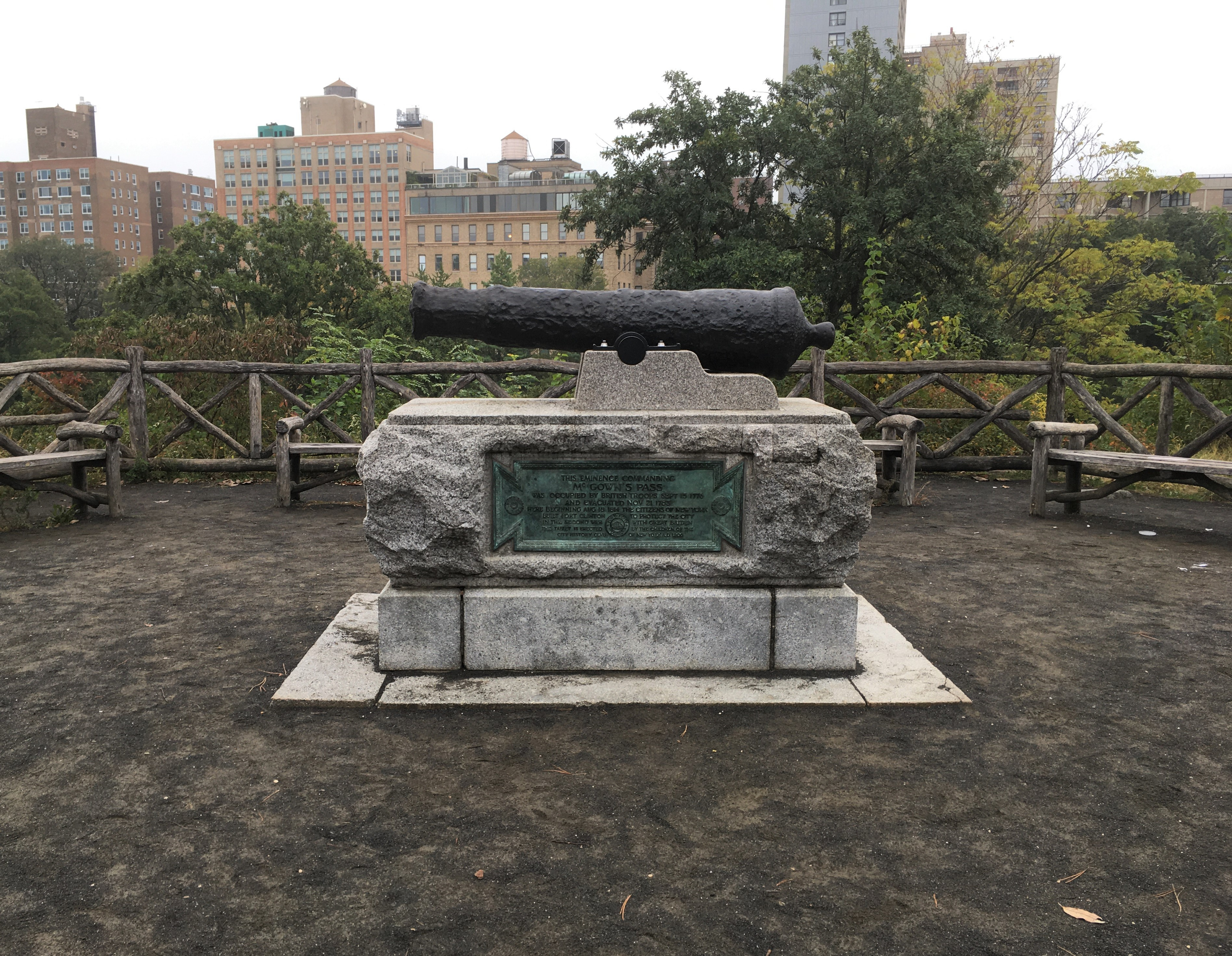
Site of Fort Clinton in 2020

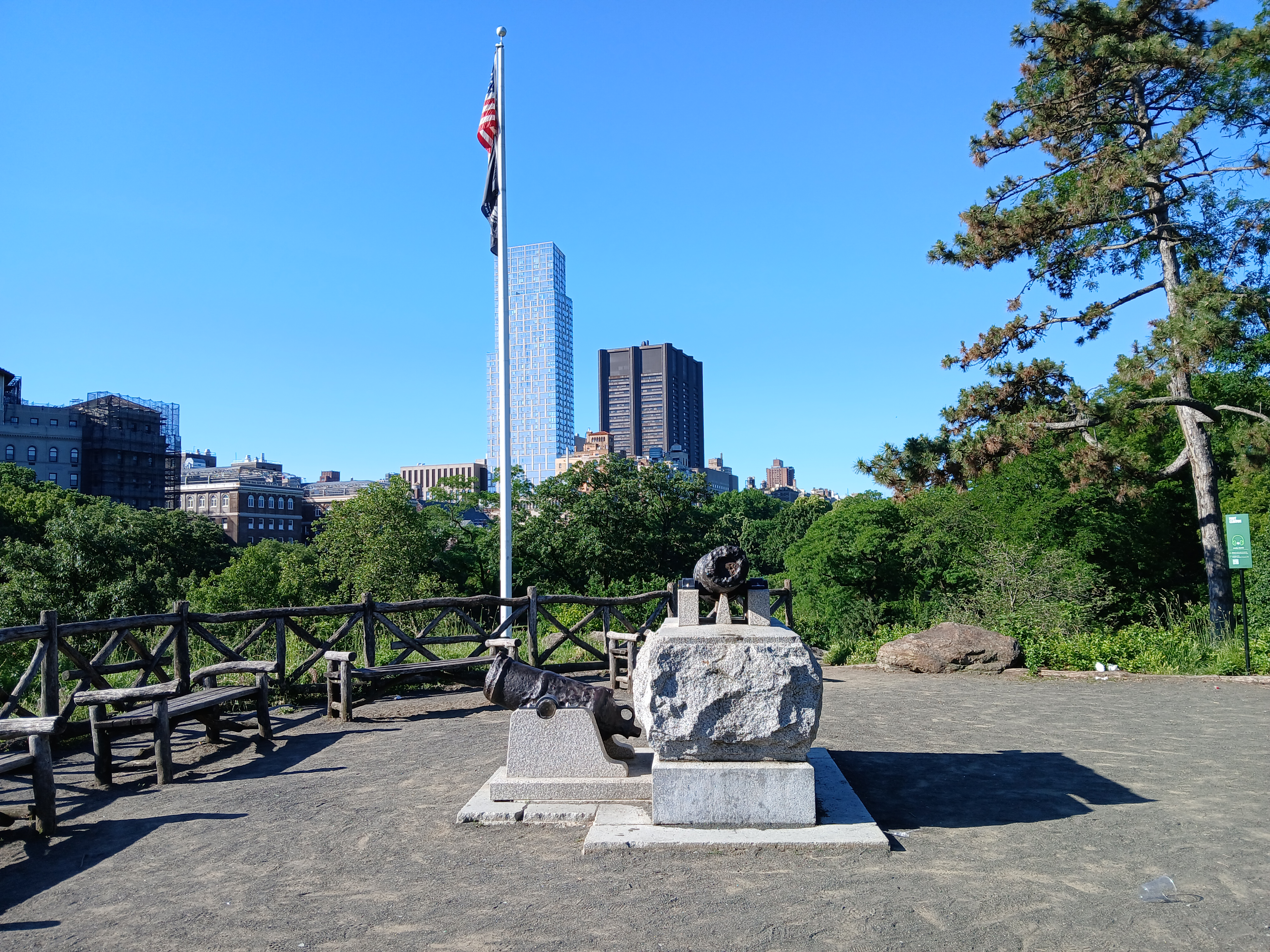
Site of Fort Clinton in 2026

== See also ==
- Blockhouse No. 1
