= Blockhouse No. 1 =

Fort in New York City's Central Park

- North Woods, Central Park, Manhattan
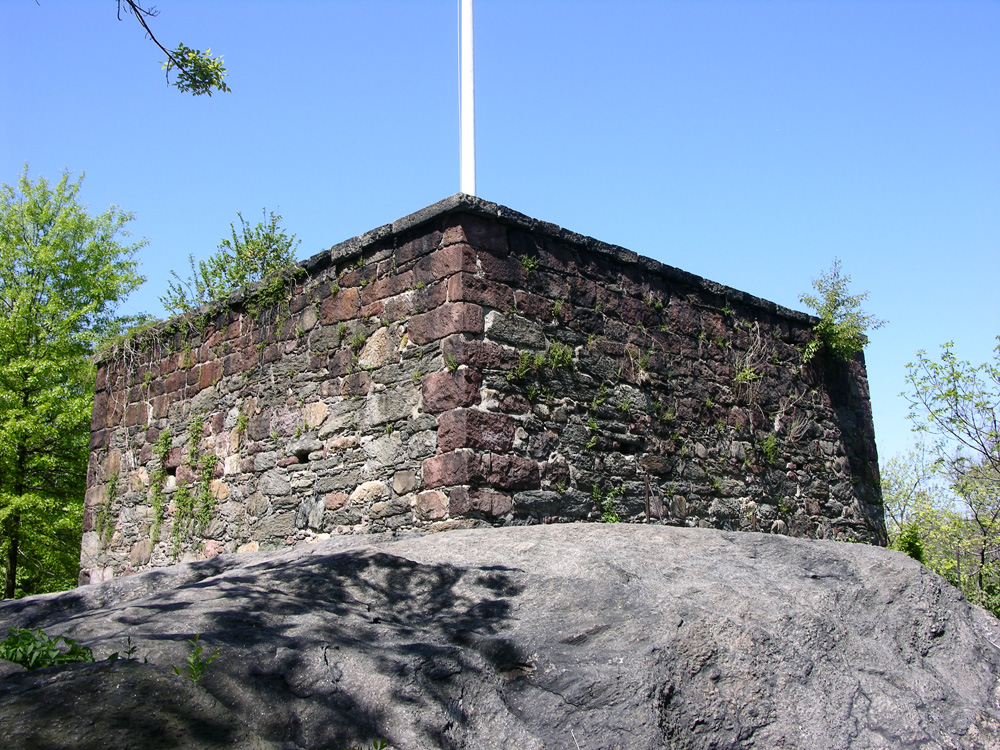

Site information
- Type: Blockhouse

Location
- Coordinates: 40.79866°N 73.95629°W

Site history
- Built: 1812–1814
- Materials: Sandstone, schist
- Fate: Closed

Notable buildings and structures of Central Park. Click on the map and then on the points for details.

Blockhouse No. 1, colloquially known as The Blockhouse, is a small fort in the North Woods section of Central Park, Manhattan, New York City. Finished in 1814, the Blockhouse is the second-oldest structure in the park, after Cleopatra's Needle, and the oldest surviving structure originally built within the park site. (Note: Cleopatra's Needle was built in 1475 BC but was relocated in Central Park in 1881.) It is located on an overlook of Manhattan schist, with a clear view of the flat surrounding areas north of Central Park.

The fort was part of a series of fortifications in northern Manhattan, which originally also included three fortifications in Harlem Heights (now Morningside Heights). It was accompanied by Blockhouses No. 2, 3, and 4 in Morningside Park. The fort is the last remaining fortification from these defenses. Frederick Law Olmsted and Calvert Vaux, the designers of Central Park, treated Blockhouse No. 1 as a picturesque ruin, romantically overrun with vines and Alpine shrubbery.

== Construction ==
The Blockhouse was likely built on a foundation of a structure dating back to a much earlier date. In 1776, during the Revolutionary War, British and Hessian troops sealed off lower Manhattan from colonial armies by controlling the pass and defending it through a series of fortifications. From trial excavations performed in 1995, it has been determined that the foundations of Blockhouse No. 1 date back to this time of British occupation of Manhattan.

The current fort was constructed in three phases. In the first phase, under the direction of General Joseph Gardner Swift, the fort was hastily constructed by New Yorkers during the War of 1812 in anticipation of a British invasion. The building was assembled by volunteers who brought the building materials with them, hence the red sandstone blocks included with the Manhattan schist. The fort consists of a two-story bunker surrounding a small area, inside which a wooden platform would have originally stood. The wooden platform was sunken with a revolving turret for a cannon. The sides held small gunports. This structure was likely connected to the ground by a small staircase. Construction on the tower was completed December 22, 1814, two days before the Treaty of Ghent was signed to end the war.

The second phase was during its use as an ammunition and storage building. During this time the top two feet of stone-work were added. They are noticeably different in color, composition, and stonework.

Later at the turn of the 20th century, the current entrance and staircase were added, as was the tall flagpole in the center of the fort.

It was described in 1905 as standing 19 feet (5.8 m) tall at the western wall and having a base 34 feet (10 m) square.

== Location ==
Blockhouse No. 1 stands in North Woods at the northwest corner of Central Park, at a location that is still rugged, high, and hard to reach. It is located south of North Drive and north of the Huddlestone Arch. The building overlooks Harlem Meer and the Lasker Rink to the east.

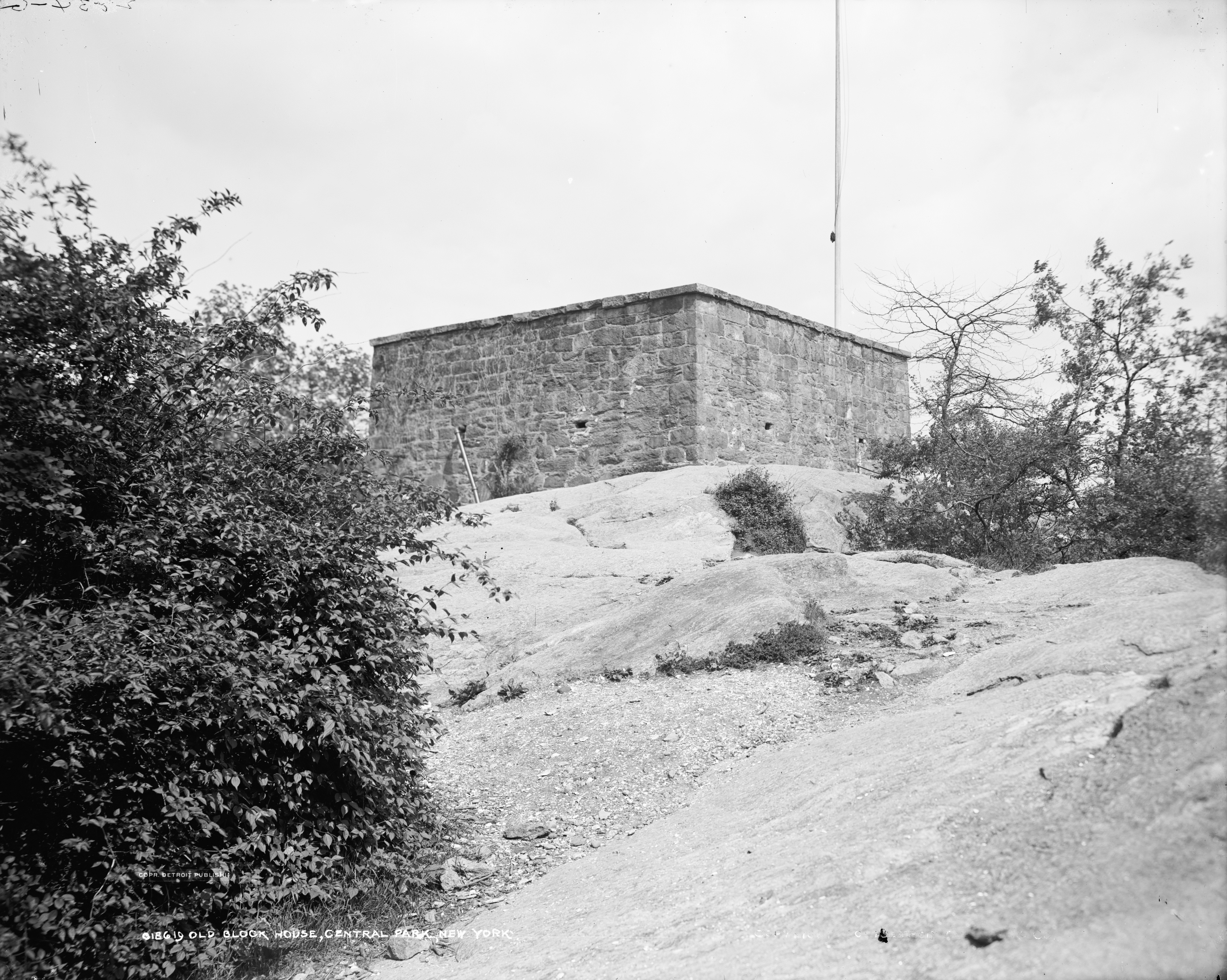
Blockhouse No. 1 in 1905

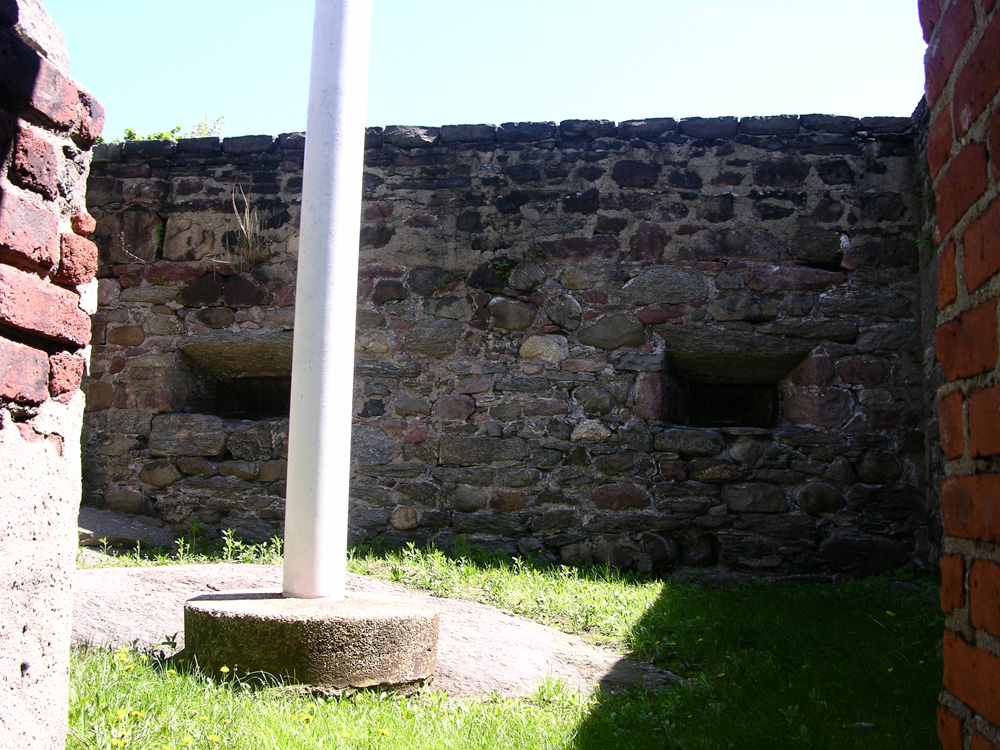
The interior of the Blockhouse in 2010; a modern flagpole is visible in the center

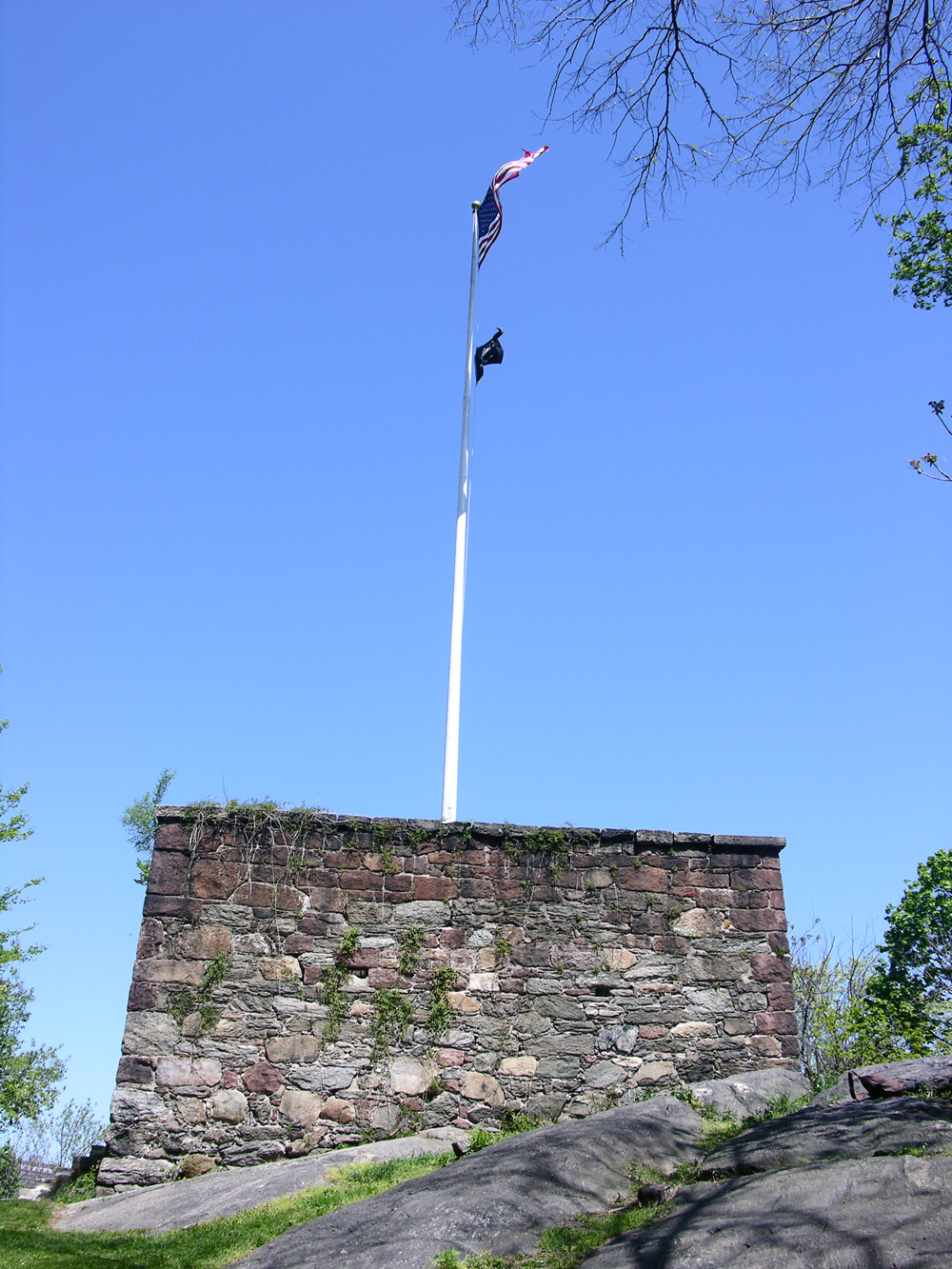
Full view from the south, where the structure is relatively easily accessible

== Uses ==
This structure was initially built as a defensive fort for New York City and soldiers were stationed at the Blockhouse. At its height, nearly 2,000 New York state militiamen garrisoned the fortifications. However, the British did not attack New York City, and as such the Blockhouse never saw combat. The Treaty of Ghent was signed on Christmas Eve 1814, and the fort was abandoned shortly thereafter. It was subsequently used for ammunition storage. In the early 20th century it was used as a place to celebrate patriotic holidays.

The structure is currently unoccupied and unused. A large metal gate covers the door. Occasional tours are provided by the Urban Park Rangers, but independent exploration of the interior is not allowed.

== Lost plaque ==
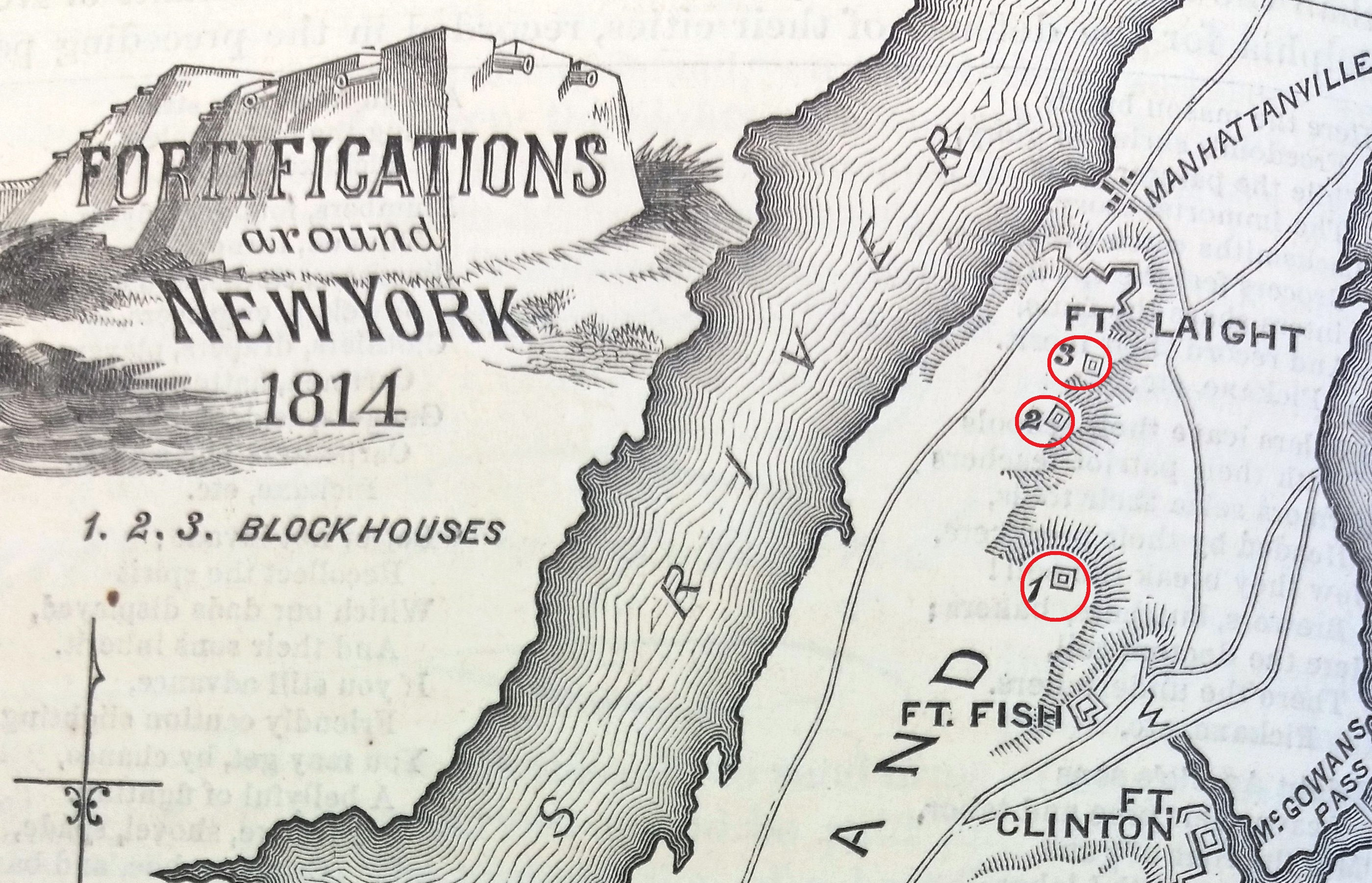
Location of blockhouses relative to other New York defenses; Blockhouse No. 1 is the southernmost of the three. (detail, full map here)

The Blockhouse had a bronze tablet commemorating its history placed above the door, placed on June 10, 1905. The ceremony was performed by Mary Van Buren Vanderpoel, president of the Women's Auxiliary to the American Scenic and Historic Preservation Society. Receiving the plaque was General Frederick Dent Grant. The plaque was stolen from its location and was noticed to be missing on March 28, 1913. The plaque was documented in a copyrighted picture and was located above the door. The plaque read "This blockhouse was part of a line of fortifications extending from the Hudson to the Harlem River built for the defense of New York by it's [sic] patriotic citizens during the war of 1812-1815. This tablet is erected by the Women's Auxiliary to the American Scenic and Historic Preservation Society A.D. 1905". In 1999, the Blockhouse had a new sign erected, describing its history. However, the second plaque has also now gone missing.

== See also ==
- Fort Clinton (Central Park)
- Fort Fish
- Nutter's Battery
