= Kirtley F. Mather =

American geologist

Kirtley Fletcher Mather
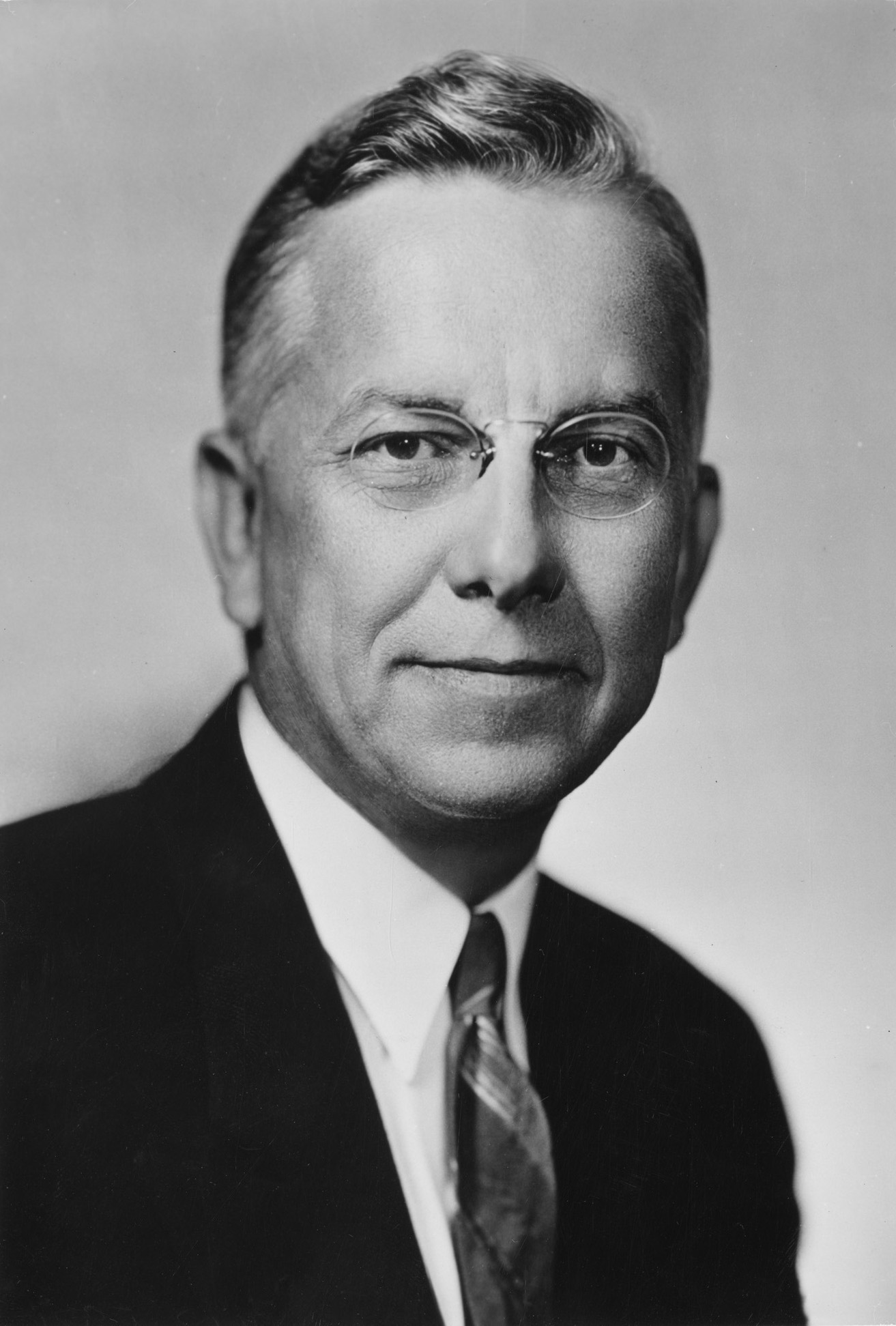
- Born: February 13, 1888; Chicago, Illinois, US
- Died: May 5, 1978 (aged 90); Albuquerque, New Mexico, US
- Education: Denison University, University of Chicago
- Occupations: Geologist; educator; social activist; civil liberties advocate
- Employer: Harvard University
- Partner(s): Marie Porter Mather, Muriel Williams Mather
- Awards: Cullum Geographical Medal, 1964 Edison Award for the best science book for young people, 1964 Book Award of the Geographic Society of Chicago

Kirtley Fletcher Mather (February 13, 1888 – May 5, 1978) was an American geologist and faculty member at Harvard University. An expert on petroleum geology and mineralogy, Mather was a scholar, advocate for academic freedom, social activist, and critic of McCarthyism. He worked to harmonize the dialogue between science and religion, played a role in the Scopes "Monkey Trial", supported adult education programs and advocated for civil liberties.

== Early life ==
Kirtley Mather was the second of six children born to William Green Mather and Julia Sabrina King. William Mather was the son of a Baptist minister. Mather is related to Increase and Cotton Mather, well known New England Puritan ministers. They are all directly descended from Rev. Richard Mather. The family's religious heritage would be significant in forming young Mather's social conscience.

Mather was born and grew up in Chicago, Illinois and graduated from South Chicago High School in 1904. After completing his first two years of undergraduate studies at the University of Chicago, he transferred to Denison University, where the school had a strong Baptist heritage and his older brother was a student. After graduating from Denison in 1909, he returned to the University of Chicago, where he completed his Ph.D. degree in 1915.

== Career ==
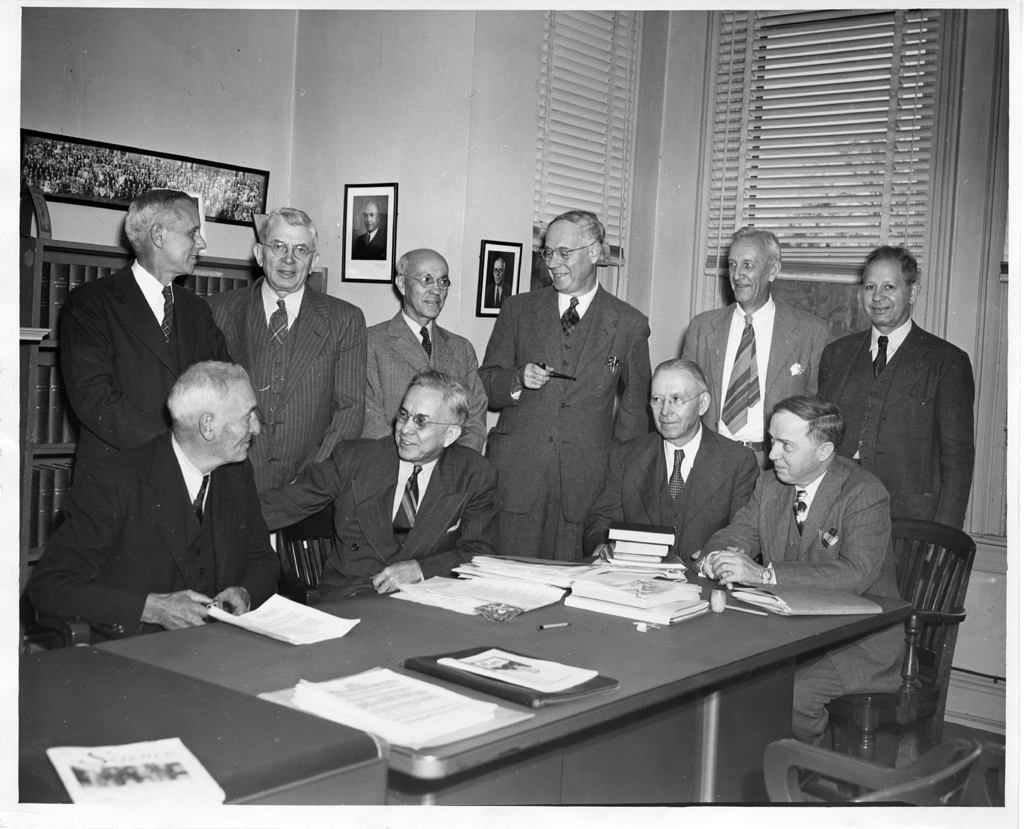
American Association for the Advancement of Science officers and senior officials in 1947. Left to right, standing: Edmund Ware Sinnott, George Alfred Baitsell, Fernandus Payne, Karl Lark-Horovitz, Walter Richard Miles, Elvin Charles Stakman, sitting: Anton Julius Carlson, Kirtley Fletcher Mather, Forest Ray Moulton, Harlow Shapley.

As an academic scientist, Mather's areas of expertise were in the fields of petroleum geology and mineralogy. His teaching career began at the University of Arkansas (1911–1914), while he was still in his doctoral program. After completing his graduate studies, he held faculty positions at Queen's University (1915–1918) and Denison University (1918–1924), before beginning a 30-year teaching career at Harvard University in 1924. For a period of time during his tenure at Harvard, he served as chairman of the geology department. In addition to his teaching duties at Harvard, he served as the Director of the Harvard Summer School from 1933 through 1938. During his retirement in Albuquerque, he served as a visiting faculty member at the University of New Mexico.

Mather was an proponent of readily accessible adult education programs. Although he was associated with an elite university for 30 years, he believed that the interests of democracy were more closely associated with adult literacy and education programs for all citizens. Mather was a supporter of Dorothy Hewitt and the Boston Center for Adult Education she founded.

Mather was entrusted with leadership responsibilities for several national professional organizations. In 1938, he served as the head of the Association of Summer Session Deans and Directors. In 1951, he became a member of the board of trustees for Science Service, now known as Society for Science & the Public. He served as board president of the American Association for the Advancement of Science from 1948 to 1956 and the American Academy of Arts and Sciences from 1957 to 1961. For his scholarship in the field of geology, he was awarded the Cullum Geographical Medal in 1965. Additionally, in 1964, for his book The Earth Beneath Us, Mather received the Edison Award for the best science book for young people and the Book Award of the Geographic Society of Chicago.

=== Scopes "Monkey Trial" ===
Mather played a part in the 1925 Scopes "Monkey Trial". For the trial he submitted a deposition for the defense and helped Clarence Darrow rehearse his questioning of William Jennings Bryan. Mather's biographer, Kennard Bork, notes this in relation to Mather's involvement with the trial:

By 1924 Mather had already perceived the threat of biblical literalism as used by some segments of the religious right. Offended by methods and claims of the anti-evolutionists, he declared that his love of religion, as well as his commitment to science, drove him to oppose William Jennings Bryan and the prosecutors of organic evolution.

== Academic freedom and social activism ==
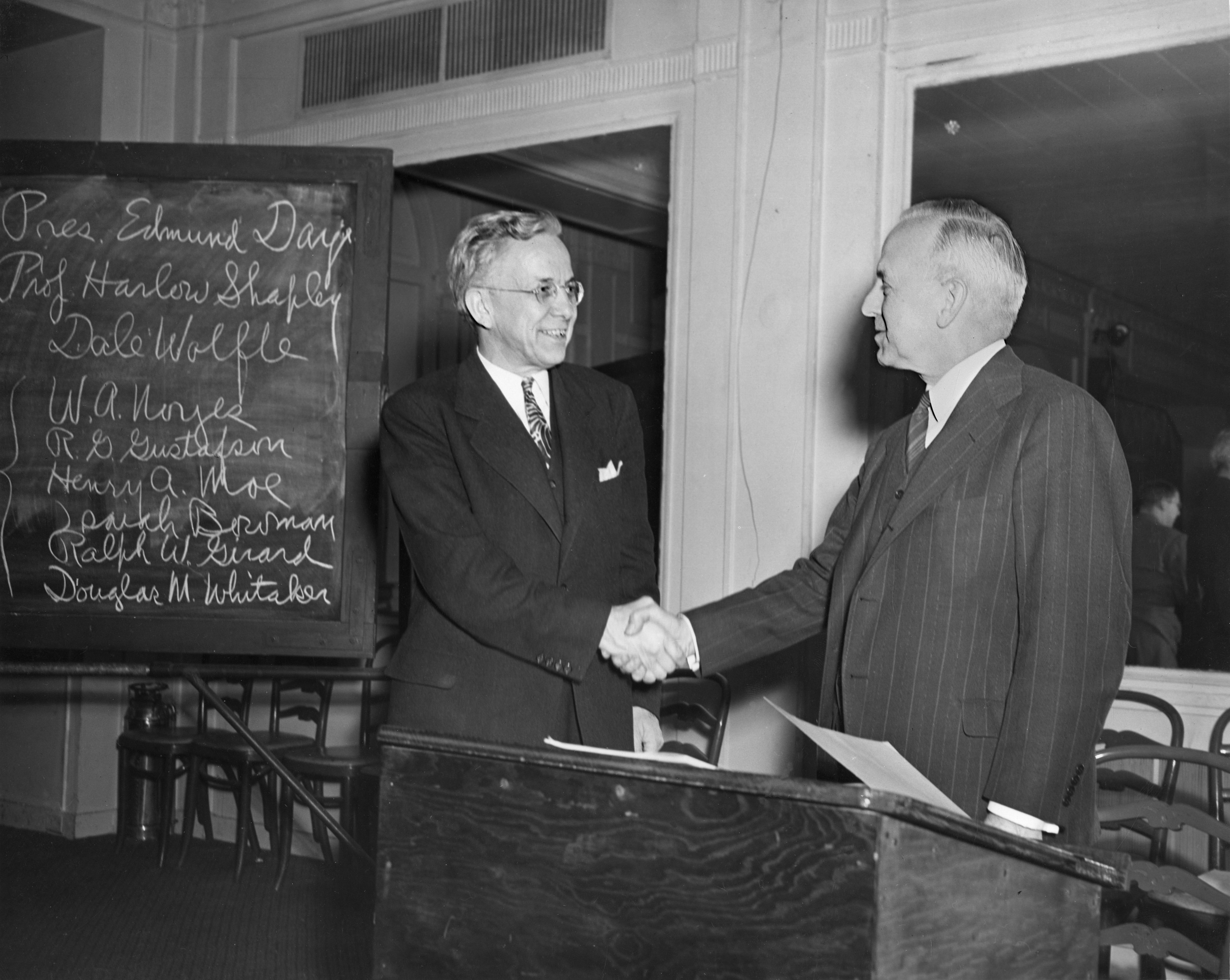
Mather with Cornell President Edmund Ezra Day in 1947

Mather was committed to progressive social causes, serving as the first president of Promoting Enduring Peace. From the academy, to the court room and on the national stage, Mather was advocate and activist for academic freedom and human rights. A harbinger of Mather's willingness to stakeout unpopular positions in the service of academic freedom is what his biographer, Kennard Bork refers to as the “Kornhauser Affair” at Denison University in 1922. In this instance Mather championed the cause of Professor Sidney I. Kornhauser whose failure to achieve tenure was perceived by many colleagues to involve anti-semitic or anti-liberal bias among some university supporters and members of the administration. Kornhauser went on to a teaching career at the University of Louisville, where the medical school's library bears his name.

=== Massachusetts Teachers' Oath ===
Mather took a leadership role in resisting the Massachusetts Teachers' Oath of 1935. The loyalty oath was adopted by the Massachusetts state legislature and enforced by Harvard President James B. Conant. The entire affair contributed to efforts by Mather and fellow Harvard faculty members like F.O. Matthiessen and Max Lerner to form the Cambridge Union of University Teachers, Harvard's chapter of the American Federation of Teachers.

In 1937, Mather co-founded the Institute for Propaganda Analysis with Edward A. Filene and Clyde R. Miller. From 1946 to 1949, Mather was chairman of the Massachusetts Civil Liberties Union. He was described by the Harvard Crimson as an "outspoken critic of McCarthyism". A measure of the Red Scare price that Mather would pay for his activism is reflected in the April 4, 1949, issue of Life magazine. In an article subsection titled Dupes and Fellow Travelers Dress Up Communist Fronts, Mather is pictured among 50 prominent academics, scientists, clergy and writers, including Albert Einstein, Arthur Miller, Lillian Hellman, Langston Hughes, Norman Mailer and fellow Harvard professors, F.O. Matthiessen, Corliss Lamont and Ralph Barton Perry.

== Personal life ==
Mather was married twice, first to Marie Porter Mather from 1912 until her death in 1971. They were parents to three daughters, Florence (1916–2006), Julia (1920–1986) and Jean (1929-2021). Florence married Sherman Wengard, who taught petroleum geology at the University of New Mexico. Julia (“Judy”) was on the staff at Denison University and married to LeRoy Seils, Professor of Health and Physical Education and Athletic Director at Denison. Jean married Dean W. Seibel and they had three children, Steve, Linda, and Geoffrey.

He married Muriel Williams Mather in 1977. They were together until his death. Upon his retirement from Harvard in 1954, he and Marie traveled widely around the world, finally settling in Albuquerque, New Mexico, where he resided until his death at the age of 90. During his retirement years in Albuquerque, he served as a visiting faculty member at the University of New Mexico. Mather died on May 5, 1978, in Albuquerque.

== Legacy ==
Mather was a scientist and academic who took progressive and often controversial stands on issues of academic freedom and human rights. In addition to the legacy of his scholarship, he stands among twentieth century American scientists who sought to harmonize the dialogue between science and religion and to ally himself with progressive social causes. Archives of his research and correspondence are held by both the University of Chicago and Denison University.

In 1982, Lynn Elfner reflected on the Scopes Trial and Mather's legacy:

Mather's motivation throughout most of his life was the defense of civil liberties and the academic freedom of many of his colleagues. His education was not in jurisprudence; rather, it was grounded in basic geology and was greatly aided by extensive field experience over much of the earth. To this must be added a great love of people and an unusual ability to persuade and influence others to his views. He was a rare individual who successfully bridged the gap between science and religion. He was comfortable and respected in both camps. Today his wisdom and authority are more important than ever.

== Published works ==
- 1922: Front Ranges of the Andes between Santa Cruz, Bolivia, and Embarcación, Argentina, Geological Society of America Bulletin, v.33, p. 703-764
- 1928: Old Mother Earth
- 1928: Science in Search of God
- 1930: Sons of the Earth
- 1932: Physiography and Quaternary Geology of the San Juan Mountains, Colorado (with W.W. Atwood): U.S. Geology Survey, Professional Paper 166
- 1934: Laboratory Manual of Physical and Historical Geology (with C.J. Roy)
- 1937: Adult Education: A Dynamic for Democracy (with Dorothy Hewitt), Appleton-Century, New York
- 1939: A Source Book in Geology, 1400-1900 (edited with S.L. Mason), originally published by McGraw Hill, 1939, subsequently published by Harvard University Press, 1967, ISBN 0674822773
- 1944: Enough and to Spare
- 1949: Crusade for Life, The John Calvin McNair Lectures, University of North Carolina
- 1950: A Laboratory Manual for Geology: I (with C.J. Roy and L.R. Thiesmeyer), Physical Geology
- 1952: A Laboratory Manual for Geology, II (with C.J. Roy), Historical Geology
- 1961: The World In Which We Live
- 1964: The Earth Beneath Us, photos by Josef Muench, drawings by Howard Morris, Random House, ISBN 0394422910 (translated into French, German, Italian and Dutch; winner of the 1964 Thomas A. Edison Award and the 1964 Book Award of the Geographic Society of Chicago. A revised edition was published in 1975
- 1967: A Source Book in Geology, 1900-1950, (editor), Harvard University Press, 1969, ISBN 0674822757

== Biography ==
- Cracking Rocks and Defending Democracy: Kirtley Fletcher Mather, scientist, teacher, social activist, 1888–1978, Kennard Baker Bork, Ph.D., Pacific Division, American Association for the Advancement of Science, 1994, ISBN 0934394091
