= George Alfred Baitsell =

American biologist (1885-1971)

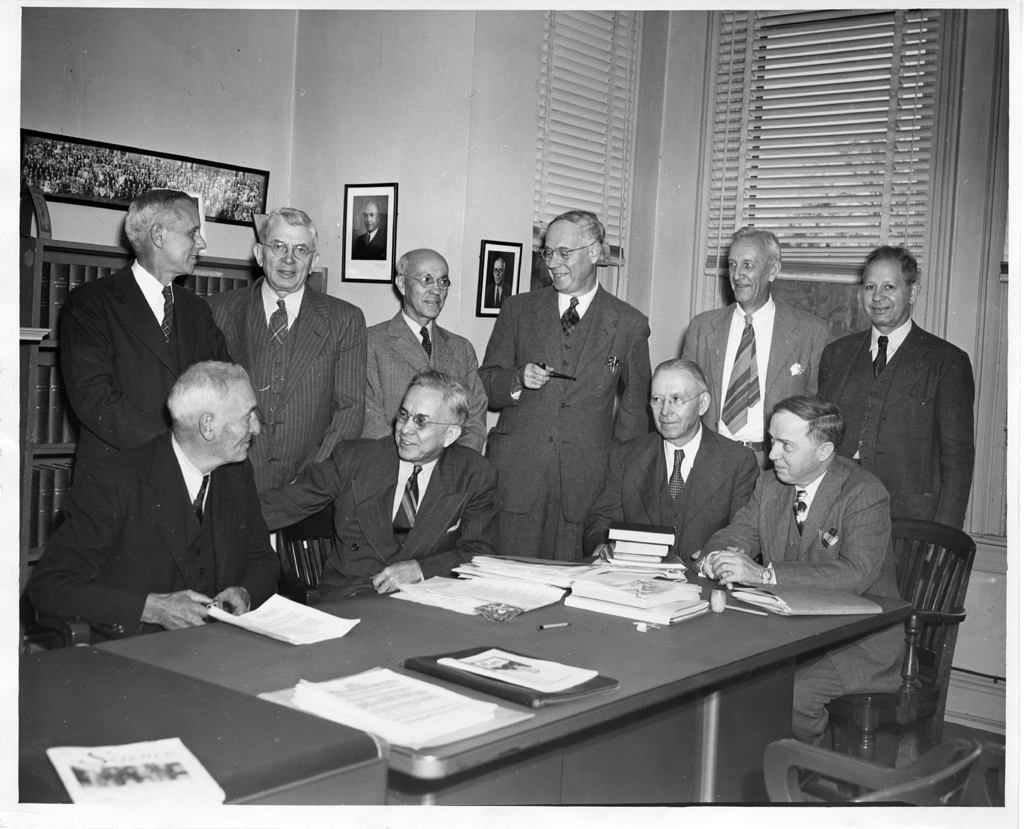
- Officers and senior officials of the American Association for the Advancement of Science in 1947. Left to right, standing: Sinnott, Baitsell, Payne, Lark-Horovitz, Miles, Stakman, sitting: Carlson, Mather, Moulton, Shapley.
- Born: 1885; Iowa
- Died: September 24, 1971; Winter Park, Florida
- Education: B.S. Central University of Iowa 1908, M.A. Yale University 1909
- Alma mater: Yale University
- Spouse: Dorothy Morton Horning (1885-1967)
- Children: John Morton Baitsell and Dorothy (DeeDee) Baitsell
- Scientific career
- Fields: Biology
- Institutions: Yale University
- Thesis: Experiments on the reproduction of the Hypotrichous Infusoria (1914)

George Alfred Baitsell (1885 – September 24, 1971) was an American biologist. He was professor of biology at Yale University. He was an official of the American Association for the Advancement of Science, and published several science books.

== Publications ==
- The evolution of man, New Haven, Yale University Press, 1922
- Manual of animal biology, New York, Macmillan, 1932
- Human biology, New York, McGraw-Hill, 1940
- Science in progress, New Haven, Yale University Press, 1949 (editor)
- The Centennial of the Sheffield Scientific School, Yale University Press, 1950 (editor)

== Family ==
George Alfred Baitsell was the first son of John Albert Baitsell (1847-1929) and Amanda Clammer (1859-1936); he had a sister, Bessie (died in 1887 three weeks after her birth), and two brothers, John Merrill (1889-1905), and Carl Merrill (born 1891). He and his wife Dorothy Morton Horning (1885-1967) had a son, John Morton Baitsell, and Dorothy (DeeDee) Baitsell. John Morton Baitsell married Carol Todd and is survived by his two children, John Baitsell Jr. and Sarah Baitsell Oliver. John Baitsell Jr. has two children, Adam Baitsell and Aidan Baitsell. Sarah Oliver is married to Mark Oliver, and has two children, Annie Oliver and Wilson Oliver.
