= Dario Angelo Alberto Vignali =

British-American immunologist

- Born: London
- Occupations: Immunologist and academic
- Awards: Merrill J. Egorin Excellence in Scientific Leadership Award (2018); Elsie Hillman Distinguished Scholar Award, PNC (2019)

Academic background
- Education: BSc, Immunology and Medical Biology; PhD, Immunology of Infectious Diseases
- Alma mater: University of East London; London School of Hygiene and Tropical Medicine, University of London
- Thesis: Studies on the immune mechanisms employed in the in vivo vaccine-induced elimination of Schistosoma manson (1988)

Dario Angelo Alberto Vignali is a British/American immunologist and an academic. He is the Chair of the Immunology Department at the University of Pittsburgh, where he is also a Distinguished Professor and the Frank Dixon Chair for Cancer Immunology. He is also associate director for Scientific Strategy and Co-Leader of the Cancer Immunology and Immunotherapy Program at the UPMC Hillman Cancer Center.

Vignali is most known for his research in cancer immunology, autoimmunity, T cell signaling and inhibitory immune mechanisms. He has published publications in academic journals, including Nature, Nature Immunology, Nature Cancer, Nature Biotechnology, Nature Methods, Science, Science Translational Medicine, Science Immunology, Science Signaling, Cell and Immunity. Furthermore, he has been a highly cited researcher annually since 2016.

Vignali is the recipient of the 2018 Merrill J. Egorin Excellence in Scientific Leadership Award, and the 2019 PNC Elsie Hillman Distinguished Scholar Award.

== Education ==
Vignali earned a BSc in Immunology and Medical Microbiology from University of East London (formerly North East London Polytechnic) in 1985. Later in 1988, he completed his PhD in Immunology of Infectious Diseases from the London School of Hygiene and Tropical Medicine, University of London.

== Career ==
From 1993 to 1999, he held the position of assistant member in the Department of Immunology at St. Jude Children's Research Hospital, concurrently serving as assistant professor in the Department of Pathology at the University of Tennessee Medical Center. Transitioning to the role of associate member from 1999 to 2008 at St. Jude Children's Research Hospital, he also assumed the role of associate professor in the Department of Pathology at the University of Tennessee Medical Center from 2000 to 2009. Subsequently, he held the position of vice chair and member of the Department of Immunology at St. Jude Children's Research Hospital from 2008 to 2014, alongside his professorship in the Department of Pathology at the University of Tennessee Medical Center.

In 2014, Vignali moved to Pittsburgh to become vice chair and professor in the Immunology Department at the University of Pittsburgh School of Medicine, and co-leader of the Cancer Immunology Program at the UPMC Hillman Cancer Center. He has held the Frank Dixon Chair in Cancer Immunology since 2017, while also serving as Co-leader of the Cancer Immunology and Immunotherapy Program and associate director for Scientific Strategy since 2018. Additionally, he assumed the roles of Distinguished Professor of Immunology at the University of Pittsburgh School of Medicine in 2021 and Chair of the Immunology Department in 2023.

Vignali's research has led to 15 patent awards (11 in the US) covering LAG3, NRP1 and IL35. Moreover, he is the co-founder of companies, including Potenza Therapeutics, Tizona Therapeutics and Novasenta.

== Research ==
Vignali's contributions encompass distinct areas, exploring aspects of basic and translational immunology, with a focus on cancer and autoimmune disease.

=== Inhibitory receptors ===
Vignali has studied the inhibitory receptor Lymphocyte-Activation Gene 3 (LAG3), yielding insights, notably demonstrating the role of LAG3 in regulating Treg activity and function. His 2012 research uncovered the synergistic cooperation of anti-LAG3 and anti-PD1 agents in limiting anti-tumor immunity in models of cancer. This discovery was extended in his subsequent studies, wherein he showcased the potency of LAG3 as an inhibitory receptor when it could not be shed from the cell surface by the metalloprotease ADAM10, highlighting the ability of LAG3 to serve as a resistance factor limiting the efficacy of anti-PD1 immunotherapeutics. This study not only underscored the therapeutic potential of targeting LAG3, but also prompted the initiation of a clinical trial, RELATIVITY-047, evaluating the efficacy of anti-LAG3 (Relatlimab) in combination with anti-PD1 (Nivolumab) in patients with metastatic melanoma who had not previously received therapy. His research also focused on the regulatory function of LAG3 in autoimmune diseases, and explored other inhibitory receptors such as PD1 and NRP1. Additionally, his research examined the molecular mechanisms underlying the suppressive effects of LAG3 on T cell signaling, revealing that LAG3 inhibits T cell function by disrupting co-receptor-TCR signaling through altering pH and dissociating Lck from CD4 or CD8, independently of its canonical ligand major histocompatibility complex class II. Furthermore, his investigation into the maintenance of an exhaustion-like program in T cells by LAG3 has provided insight into the regulation of T cell function in various disease contexts.

=== Regulatory T cells ===
Vignali's lab has conducted efforts to elucidate pathways crucial for controlling Treg (regulatory T cell) function, particularly within tumor contexts, to pinpoint potential targets for immunotherapy. His research resulted in two major developments. In 2007, he identified interleukin-35 (IL-35) as a novel inhibitory cytokine produced by Tregs. Subsequent investigations revealed that IL-35 plays a pivotal role in generating an induced regulatory T cell subset termed iTr35, which appeared to be abundant within the tumor microenvironment (TME). Moreover, his group was the first to uncover the IL-35 receptor and elucidate its distinct signaling pathway. Recently, his work has demonstrated that neutralizing IL-35 or selectively deleting it in Tregs restricts tumor growth across various cancer models and leads to diminished expression of inhibitory receptors (IRs) on tumor-infiltrating lymphocytes (TILs). His work has also demonstrated that within the TME, distinct Treg subpopulations produce both IL-35 and IL-10, and these cytokines collaboratively drive the expression of multiple IRs (such as PD1, LAG3, TIM3, and TIGIT) on effector T cells, with the process being regulated by BLIMP.

In 2013, Vignali's group pioneered the identification of a pathway involving neuropilin-1 (NRP1) and semaphorin-4a (SEMA4A), crucial for maintaining intratumoral Treg stability, function, and survival. This research demonstrated that genetic deletion of NRP1 specifically in Tregs renders preclinical models largely resistant to tumor growth, without eliciting autoimmune or inflammatory diseases typically associated with Treg loss. Importantly, this pathway appears dispensable for peripheral tolerance maintenance. Further, the cytokine interferon-gamma (IFN) was shown to be a primary driver of Treg fragility, that was limited by NRP1 in the TME^{R}. His group subsequently showed that NRP1 expression on human Tregs was frequently associated with poorer outcomes and NRP1+ Tregs were more suppressive. Additionally, his findings also demonstrated that targeting either Nrp1 or Sema4a significantly impedes tumor growth, suggesting promising avenues for further preclinical validation and testing.

=== T cell receptor signaling and function ===
In 2000, Vignali's group showed that while TCR downmodulation occurs following ligation by MHC:peptide complexes, it is primarily driven by the prevention of recycling rather than by increased internalization, highlighting the role of constitutive internalization in serial ligation and the mechanisms of T cell activation. In his 2008 research, it was revealed that the quantity of cytoplasmic ITAMs in the TCR-CD3 complex significantly influences T cell function, preventing autoimmunity and ensuring immune homeostasis via central tolerance mechanisms. His 2010 work investigated the regulation of TCR:CD3 complex expression during T-cell development, demonstrating that constitutive ubiquitylation in immature thymocytes, mediated by specific molecular pathways, precisely controls TCR levels and influences signaling thresholds crucial for immune cell maturation and function. Furthermore, his 2013 research proposed that the pathways initiated by the TCR for cytokine secretion and proliferation are distinct and are coordinated by the multiplicity of phosphorylated ITAMs in the TCR-CD3 complex.

=== Systems immunology ===
As part of his systems immunology research, Vignali investigated the transcriptional profiles of immune cells in HPV-positive and HPV-negative head and neck squamous cell carcinoma. The study highlighted divergent signatures among certain cell types and identified a CD4+ T follicular helper cell gene expression signature associated with longer progression-free survival. In his 2020 collaborative study with the Bruno group, their team examined the role of B cells in head and neck squamous cell carcinoma (HNSCC) and found distinct phenotypic differences between HPV-positive and HPV-negative tumors, with HPV+ tumors showing increased presence of germinal center B cells and tertiary lymphoid structures, correlated with better survival, and production of antibodies targeting HPV viral antigens. In 2022, his collaborative study with the Oesterreich group on estrogen receptor-positive (ER+) breast cancer highlighted that macrophages, not T cells, dominate the tumor microenvironment, with an interplay between macrophages and T cells correlating with longer disease-free survival in invasive ductal carcinoma but not invasive lobular carcinoma.

=== Synthetic cancer immunobiology ===
Vignali has made contributions to immunology and translational medicine by advancing methodologies such as bead-based multiplexed cytokine assays. Additionally, his group researched and popularized the use of 2A peptide-based 'self-cleaving' multicistronic expression systems in viral vectors and preclinical models. Their research also resulted in the creation of a technique for producing 'TCR retrogenics,' simplifying the use of multicistronic vectors connected by 2A sequences in TCR- or CAR-based adoptive T cell immunotherapy for cancer. Moreover, his group also developed a method for rapid analysis of T-cell selection in vivo using T cell-receptor retrogenics.

== Awards and honors ==
- 2007 – Faculty Mentoring Award, St. Jude Children's Research Hospital
- 2018 – Merrill J. Egorin Excellence in Scientific Leadership Award
- 2019 – PNC Elsie Hillman Distinguished Scholar Award

== Selected articles ==
- Szymczak, A. L., Workman, C. J., Wang, Y., Vignali, K. M., Dilioglou, S., Vanin, E. F., & Vignali, D. A. (2004). Correction of multi-gene deficiency in vivo using a single'self-cleaving'2A peptide–based retroviral vector. Nature biotechnology, 22(5), 589–594.
- Huang, C. T., Workman, C. J., Flies, D., Pan, X., Marson, A. L., Zhou, G., ... & Vignali, D. A. (2004). Role of LAG-3 in regulatory T cells. Immunity, 21(4), 503–513.
- Holst, J., Vignali, K. M., Burton, A. R., & Vignali, D. A. (2006). Rapid analysis of T-cell selection in vivo using T cell–receptor retrogenic mice. Nature methods, 3(3), 191–197.
- Collison, L. W., Workman, C. J., Kuo, T. T., Boyd, K., Wang, Y., Vignali, K. M., ... & Vignali, D. A. (2007). The inhibitory cytokine IL-35 contributes to regulatory T-cell function. Nature, 450(7169), 566–569.
- Vignali, D. A., Collison, L. W., & Workman, C. J. (2008). How regulatory T cells work. Nature reviews immunology, 8(7), 523–532.
- Holst, J., Wang, H., Eder, K. D., Workman, C. J., Boyd, K. L., Baquet, Z., ... & Vignali, D. A. (2008). Scalable signaling mediated by T cell antigen receptor–CD3 ITAMs ensures effective negative selection and prevents autoimmunity. Nature immunology, 9(6), 658–666.
- Woo, S. R., Turnis, M. E., Goldberg, M. V., Bankoti, J., Selby, M., Nirschl, C. J., ... & Vignali, D. A. (2012). Immune inhibitory molecules LAG-3 and PD-1 synergistically regulate T-cell function to promote tumoral immune escape. Cancer research, 72(4), 917–927.
- Delgoffe, G. M., Woo, S. R., Turnis, M. E., Gravano, D. M., Guy, C., Overacre, A. E., ... & Vignali, D. A. (2013). Stability and function of regulatory T cells is maintained by a neuropilin-1–semaphorin-4a axis. Nature, 501(7466), 252–256.
- Overacre-Delgoffe, A. E., Chikina, M., Dadey, R. E., Yano, H., Brunazzi, E. A., Shayan, G., ... & Vignali, D. A. (2017). Interferon-γ drives Treg fragility to promote anti-tumor immunity. Cell, 169(6), 1130–1141.
- Guy, C., Mitrea, D. M., Chou, P. C., Temirov, J., Vignali, K. M., Liu, X., ... & Vignali, D. A. (2022). LAG3 associates with TCR–CD3 complexes and suppresses signaling by driving co-receptor–Lck dissociation. Nature immunology, 23(5), 757–767.
