= Public Welfare Medal =

Annual award of the U.S. National Academy of Sciences

The Public Welfare Medal is awarded by the U.S. National Academy of Sciences "in recognition of distinguished contributions in the application of science to the public welfare". It is the most prestigious honor conferred by the academy. First awarded in 1914, the medal has been awarded annually since 1976.

== List of recipients ==
Source: NAS (archived) and specific line sources

- Francis S. Collins (2026) "...for his pioneering research in human genetics and critical contributions to public welfare as the leader of the Human Genome Project."
- Mary-Claire King (2025) "...for her pioneering genetic research and its transformative application to human rights."
- Nancy Hopkins (2024) "For her courageous leadership over three decades in illuminating the unequal treatment of women in science, and efforts to create and ensure equal opportunity."
- Freeman A. Hrabowski, III (2023) "For his outstanding leadership in transforming U.S. science education and increasing cultural diversity within the science workforce."
- John P. Holdren (2022) "For his many years of work on behalf of science, particularly in his role as science advisor to former President Barack Obama from 2009 to 2017. Making Holdren the longest serving presidential science advisor since World War II."
- Anthony S. Fauci (2021) For "decades-long leadership in combatting emerging infectious diseases, from the AIDS crisis to the COVID-19 pandemic, and being a clear, consistent, and trusted voice in public health.”
- Kathleen Hall Jamieson (2020) "For her non-partisan crusade to ensure the integrity of facts in public discourse and development of the science of scientific communication to promote public understanding of complex issues."
- Agnes Matilda Kalibata (2019) “For her work to drive Africa’s agricultural transformation through modern science and effective policy, helping to lift more than a million Rwandans out of poverty and scaling impacts for millions more African farmers.”
- Paul Farmer (2018) "For pioneering enduring, community-based treatment strategies that demonstrate the delivery of high-quality health care in resource-poor settings in the U.S. and other countries."
- Jane Lubchenco (2017) "For her leadership in linking science, public policy, and citizen engagement to address urgent issues of global environmental change."
- Alan Alda (2016) "For his extraordinary application of the skills honed as an actor to communicating science on television and stage, and by teaching scientists innovative techniques that allow them to tell their stories to the public."
- Neil deGrasse Tyson (2015) "For his extraordinary role in exciting the public about the wonders of science, from atoms to the Universe."
- John Porter (2014) "For being a tireless and effective advocate for scientific research over more than three decades, first in Congress and then in private life, thereby helping to maintain the pre-eminent status of biomedical research in the United States."
- Bill Gates and Melinda Gates (2013) "For improving the lives of millions by applying science to some of the world's most difficult global health challenges."
- Harold T. Shapiro (2012) "For his leadership in profoundly influencing American science, helping the government, the scientific community, and the public to address some of the most complex and contentious scientific and ethical issues of our time."
- Ismail Serageldin (2011) "For outstanding leadership in promoting the use of science for sustainable development and for liberating minds from the tyranny of intolerance, bigotry, and fear, thereby opening doors to free inquiry, tolerance, and imagination."
- Eugenie C. Scott (2010) "For championing the teaching of evolution in the United States and for providing leadership to the National Center for Science Education."
- Neal F. Lane (2009)"For serving the scientific community in many executive and leadership roles and for his continuing efforts to advance and promote science and technology in the United States."
- Norman P. Neureiter (2008) "For enhancing the status of science and technology in the U.S. State Department as the first science and technology adviser to the secretary of state and for spurring international cooperation in science and technology under U.S. leadership."
- Maxine F. Singer (2007) "For providing inspired and effective leadership in matters of science and its relationship to education and public policy."
- Norman R. Augustine (2006) "For contributions to the vitality of science in the United States by bringing to industry and government a better understanding of the crucial role that fundamental scientific research must play in our long term security and economic prosperity."
- William H. Foege (2005) "For his contributions to eradicating disease and defining the public health mission, and for his leadership in building institutions committed to the public welfare."
- Maurice F. Strong (2004) "In recognition of inspired moral leadership in the 1972 and 1992 United Nations' environmental conferences and for tireless efforts to link science, technology, and society for our common benefit."
- Shirley M. Malcom (2003) "For her vision, dedication, and effectiveness in bringing science education to millions of children in the U.S. and other nations, in order to create a science-literate populace. She has made an especially important contribution by bringing high-quality science education to groups traditionally distanced from the science world, thereby empowering many young people with the skills of a scientist."
- Norman E. Borlaug (2002) "For his scientific achievements in developing new varieties of wheat and other grains and for his single-minded application of these in saving untold millions from starvation and death."
- David A. Kessler (2001) "For his courageous approach to public health issues, including insistence on the validity of drug labeling, protection of the impartiality of review boards; institution of mechanisms for fast-tracking drug approval, especially for orphan drugs and terminal malignancies; implementation of nutrient food labeling, and recognition that the addictive effects of tobacco require a more active intervention on the part of society and government. His legacy as Commissioner of the Food and Drug Administration affects the lives of all citizens."
- Gilbert F. White (2000) "For 65 years of educating colleagues, students, and governments—through research, institution-building, and policy analysis—on how to change the ways we manage water resources, mitigate hazards, and assess the environment, enabling people to aspire to a more humane coexistence with the natural world."
- Arnold O. Beckman (1999) "For his leadership in developing analytical instrumentation, and for his deep and abiding concern for the vitality of the nation's scientific enterprise."
- David A. Hamburg (1998) "For his dedication to improving the quality of life for young people; for his efforts to prevent violent conflict among nations; and for his effective leadership of the Carnegie Corporation, which has brought science and technology to bear on the paramount issues of our time."
- George W. Thorn (1997) "For his establishment, guidance, and administration of the Howard Hughes Medical Institute, a major force for the welfare both of scientists and students."
- William T. Golden (1996) "For his leadership in national science policy, which has brought science into government, and for his wise counsel to public and private institutions, which has fostered the public support of science."
- Harold Amos (1995) "For his tremendous success, for over 25 years, in encouraging and facilitating the entry and advancement of underrepresented minorities into careers in medicine and biomedical research."
- Carl Sagan (1994) "For his ability to communicate the wonder and importance of science, to capture the imagination of so many, and to explain difficult concepts of science in understandable terms."
- Jerome B. Wiesner (1993) "For his devoted and successful efforts in science policy, education, and nuclear disarmament and world peace."
- Philip H. Abelson (1992) "For his achievements in building Science magazine into an informative and widely read source of news about science and scientists and their role in society as well as one of the world's most respected journals for the publication of original research."
- Victor F. Weisskopf (1991) "For a half-century of unflagging effort to humanize the goals of science, acquaint the world with the beneficial potential of nuclear technologies, and to safeguard it from the devastation of nuclear war."
- C. Everett Koop (1990) "For his courageous public education program based on sound epidemiological evidence regarding the dangers of smoking, alcohol, and drug addiction; and for his humane and scientific approach to the problem of AIDS."
- David Packard (1989) "For his intellectual rectitude, unparalleled generosity, and lifelong dedication to bettering the quality of America's scientific education and research."
- John E. Sawyer (1988) "For his creative support and encouragement of excellence in education, conservation of scholarly and natural resources, and world betterment through medical science."
- Dale R. Corson (1987) "For his extraordinary contributions toward bringing science to the service of all segments of our society as an educator, administrator, and central figure in the formulation and communication of science policy."
- William D. Carey (1986) "For his effective and thoughtful leadership in the formulation of science policy, the communication of scientific advances and challenges to the public, the furtherance of international scientific exchange, and the support of research and development."
- I. I. Rabi (1985) "For his work on behalf of the peaceful uses of atomic energy and his ceaseless efforts to bring science into the service of humanity."
- Theodore M. Hesburgh (1984) "For his deep understanding of the importance of science in the contemporary world and his effective advocacy of the application of science and technology in dealing with critical societal problems."
- Mina Rees (1983) "For her contributions to the scientific enterprise, especially in mathematics, astronomy, and computer sciences, from wartime, through the transition from war to peace, and continuing today."
- Paul Grant Rogers (1982) "For his innovative and well-informed contributions to the country's biomedical research efforts."
- Russell E. Train (1981)
- Walter S. Sullivan (1980) "For his clarity of expression and extensive knowledge which have enabled millions of readers to understand the means and ends of scientific research."
- Cecil H. Green and *Ida M. Green (1979) "For their outstanding role as discriminating donors, seeking those opportunities where their support of science could make a qualitative difference—to people and to institutions."
- Donald A. Henderson (1978) "For his leadership in the triumphant international campaign to eliminate smallpox, an accomplishment unique in medical science, for never before has such major, life-threatening, widespread disease been essentially eradicated."
- Leona Baumgartner (1977) "For her many contributions to public health and especially her creative role in helping to transform United States population policies and programs."
- Emilio Q. Daddario (1976) "For his sustained contributions to science and the national welfare during the years he served as a Congressman."
- Leonard Carmichael (1972)
- Lister Hill (1969)
- John W. Gardner (1966) "For writings and works that have given impetus and direction to the revolution in U.S. education."
- Detlev W. Bronk (1964)
- J. G. Harrar (1963)
- James A. Shannon (1962)
- Alan T. Waterman (1960)
- James H. Doolittle (1959)
- Henry A. Moe (1958)
- Warren Weaver (1957)
- James R. Killian Jr. (1956)
- David Lilienthal (1951) "For his wise and intelligent leadership in a critical enterprise during a critical period."
- George H. Shull (1948) "In recognition of his services in the application of principles of the pure line and of hybrid vigor to the improvement of the quantity and quality of the maize crop."
- Karl T. Compton (1947) "For his notable contributions of an original character to the science of physics, his long and valuable career in the field of education and of university administration, and in recognition of his eminent service in the wartime research effort of the nation, and in the reinforcing of collaboration and understanding between civilian scientists and military men."
- Vannevar Bush (1945) "For his outstanding service in bringing to bear the scientific and engineering talent of this country upon problems of research connected with the war effort."
- John D. Rockefeller Jr. (1943) "For his services for mankind made possible by the inheritance of a great fortune and affected by a singleness of wise and lofty purpose. In the discharge of the tremendous responsibility thus laid upon him he has utilized and notably fostered the biological, social and archeological sciences to the lasting benefit of the health and welfare of this nation and of the world."
- J. Edgar Hoover (1939) "For his application of scientific methods to the problem of crime prevention."
- Willis R. Whitney (1937)
- Hugh S. Cumming (1935) "For his work on the etiology of yellow fever and studies of epidemic areas."
- Frederick F. Russell (1935)
- August Vollmer (1934) "For his application in police administration of scientific methods to crime detection and to crime prevention."
- David Fairchild (1933) "For his exceptional accomplishments in the development and promotion of plant exploration and the introduction of new plants, shrubs, and trees into the United States."
- William H. Park (1932) "For his work as head of the research laboratories of the New York City Department of Health and as a pioneer and leader both in research and in the application of scientific discovery to the prevention of disease."
- Wickliffe Rose (1931) "For his organization and direction of the work of the International Health Board of the Rockefeller Foundation by which he made, to the promotion of public health and welfare, a contribution of a world-wide significance and importance."
- Stephen T. Mather (1930) "For his long and distinguished service in connection with the development, the conservation, and the management of our national parks system."
- Charles V. Chapin (1928) "For his contributions to public health and work in the administrative control of disease."
- Charles W. Stiles (1921) "For his application of science to the public welfare in the recognition and eradication of the hookworm disease."
- Herbert Hoover (1920) "For his applications of science in the conservation, selection, and distribution of food."
- Samuel W. Stratton (1917) "For his services in introducing standards into the practice of technologists in the United States."
- Cleveland Abbe (1916) "For distinguished public service in establishing and organizing the Weather Service of the United States."
- Gifford Pinchot (1916) "For distinguished public service in organizing and directing the movement for the systematic conservation of the natural resources of the United States."
- George W. Goethals and William C. Gorgas (1914) "For their distinguished services in connection with the building of the Panama Canal."

== See also ==
- List of humanitarian and service awards
