= Fernandus =

Fernandus is a given name. Notable people with the name include:

- Fernandus Payne (1881–1977), American zoologist, geneticist, and educator
- Fernandus Vinson (born 1968), American football player

== See also ==
- Fernandes
- 2496 Fernandus, a main-belt asteroid
