= Hagit Eldar-Finkelman =

Israeli biochemist

- חגית אלדר-פינקלמן
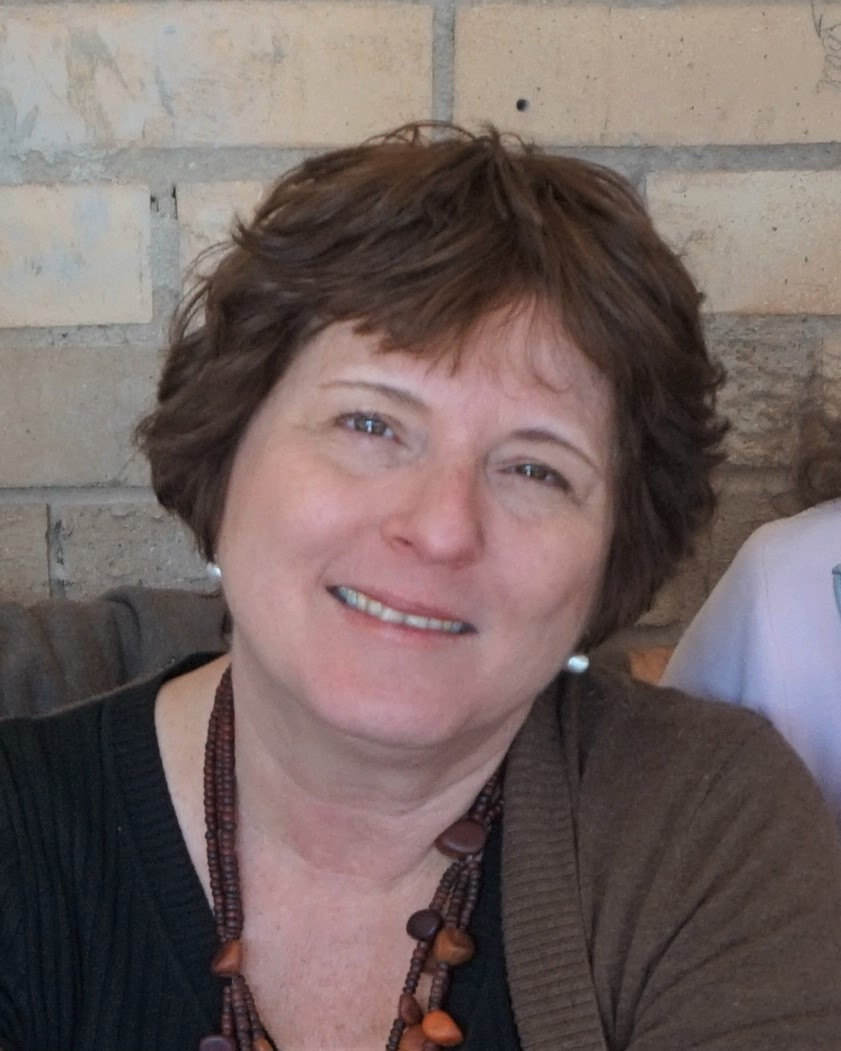
- Prof. Hagit Eldar-Finkelman - Tel Aviv University - (August 2021)
- Born: Jerusalem, Israel
- Citizenship: Israeli
- Education: Hebrew University of Jerusalem, Weizmann Institute of Science
- Known for: The pioneering work on the functions of GSK-3 and generation of novel GSK-3 inhibitors
- Awards: British Council Award, American Heart Association award, Joslin Diabetes Center Fellowship
- Scientific career
- Fields: Biological NMR, Cellular signaling, Diabetes
- Workplaces: Tel Aviv University
- Doctoral advisor: Etta Livneh

Hagit Eldar-Finkelman (Hebrew: חגית אלדר-פינקלמן) is an Israeli scientist and a principal investigator of an active research laboratory at the Sackler School of Medicine at Tel Aviv University. Eldar-Finkelman’s research is focused on the signal transduction field and drug development targeting protein kinases. She is well known for her pioneering work on the functions of GSK-3 and its contribution to diabetes and other pathogenies, including depressive behavior, Alzheimer’s diseases, and Huntington’s diseases. Novel findings also include the unique evolution of GSK-3 isozymes. Eldar-Finkelman is a leading figure in developing novel substrate competitive inhibitors (SCIs) for GSK-3 with significant benefits as drug candidates.

== Biography ==
Born in Jerusalem, Eldar-Finkelman obtained her BSc in chemistry at the Hebrew University of Jerusalem and her MSc in physical chemistry and Ph.D. in cellular signaling at the Weizmann Institute of Science (1993). She did postdoctorate at the University of Washington, working with Nobel Prize Laureate Edwin G. Krebs. She was then an assistant professor at Harvard Medical School for two years before joining Tel Aviv University in 2000. She received several awards, including the British Council Award, American Heart Association award, Joslin Diabetes Center Fellowship, Israeli Diabetes Association Award for distinguished Scientist, and the Lindner Prize of the Israel Endocrine Society. She is a full professor since 2012.

== Scientific interests and publications ==
The research in Eldar-Finkelman’s laboratory studies the molecular mechanisms underlying human disease, focusing on cellular signaling networks. A particular emphasis is given to discovering and developing new chemical tools for regulating protein kinases- key elements in signal transduction networks. Eldar-Finkelman is well known for her pioneering work on the protein kinase function, glycogen synthase kinase-3 (GSK-3), revealing its contribution to pathological disorders. Her pioneering work showed that GSK-3 is a negative feedback regulator of the insulin signaling pathway and showed its contribution to type 2 diabetes. She further presented novels mechanisms linking GSK-3 with neurodegeneration and cancer via autophagy/lysosome regulation. Eldar-Finkelman develops a unique (SCI strategy) strategy in generating highly selective GSK-3 inhibitors that function as competitive substrate inhibitors (SCIs). Accordingly, a novel class of cell-permeable peptide inhibitors was developed and provided proof of concept in treating in vivo models of diabetes depressive behavior, Alzheimer’s disease and Huntington’s diseases. A new modality of SCI called substrate converted into an inhibitor was discovered in her laboratory. The work was selected as a breakthrough of the year in drug discovery by Science Signaling. A recent new development is the design of novel small molecules based on the SCI strategy. Eldar-Finkelman published over 75 peer-reviewed articles (as Hagit Eldar 1986-1995).
