= Shirley M. Malcom =

American ecologist

Shirley Malcom
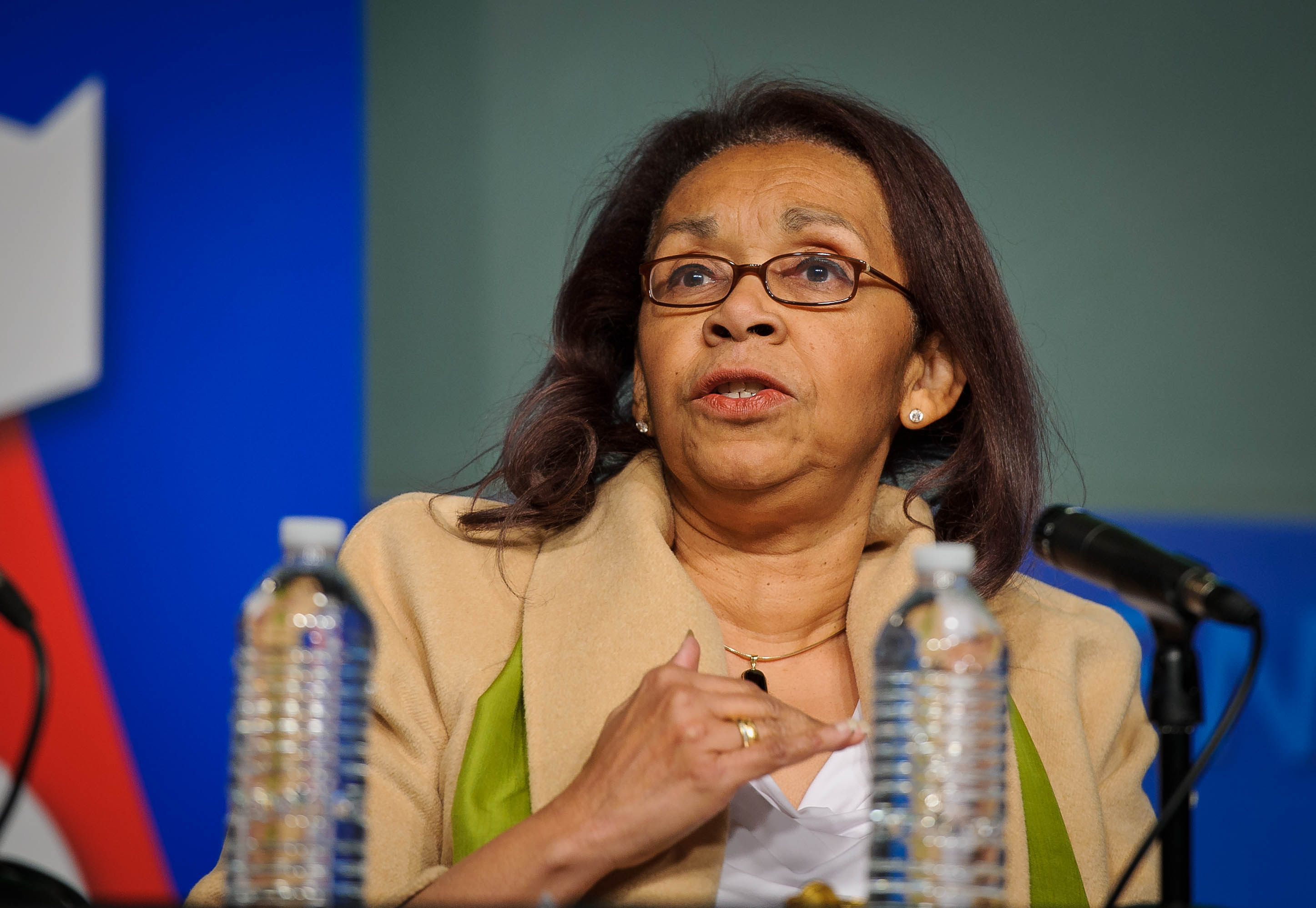
- Shirley Malcom speaking at NASA, 2012
- Born: Shirley Mahaley; September 6, 1946 (age 80); Birmingham, Alabama
- Education: University of California Los Angeles; Pennsylvania State University
- Scientific career
- Fields: Zoology
- Workplaces: University of North Carolina; American Association for the Advancement of Science

Shirley M. Malcom currently serves as a senior advisor and director of SEA Change at the American Association for the Advancement of Science (AAAS). She is a trustee of Caltech, and a regent of Morgan State University. Malcom serves on the boards of the Heinz Endowments, Public Agenda, the National Math and Science Initiative and Digital Promise.

== Early life and education ==
Malcom was born Shirley Mahaley on September 6, 1946 in Birmingham, Alabama to Ben and Lillie Mahaley.

She graduated from George Washington Carver High School at the age of 16, and left home to earn a B.S. with distinction in zoology at the University of Washington. She continued her education at the University of California at Los Angeles, receiving a M.S. in zoology in 1967. She taught high school students for a few years and later enrolled in the ecology program at Pennsylvania State University to earn a Ph.D. in 1974. Malcom returned to teaching for a year as assistant professor of biology at the University of North Carolina at Wilmington, and then moved to Washington, D.C., to work as a research associate at AAAS.

Malcom was amazed at the lack of the minorities and women in her classes and faculty members while in college. She decided to take action by becoming the program manager for the Minority Institutions Science Improvement Program at the National Science Foundation in 1977. The program provided federal funding to historically black colleges and universities for improved equipment and facilities, as well as higher salaries for the faculty. In 1979, Malcom returned to AAAS as the head of the Office of Opportunities in Science.

== Awards and honors ==
Malcom has received a variety of honors and awards, most notably her election to the American Academy of Arts and Sciences and the receipt of the 2003 Public Welfare Medal, the highest award presented by the National Academy of Sciences. She also holds 16 honorary degrees. On May 26, 2000, Malcom received an honorary doctorate from the Faculty of Social Sciences at Uppsala University, Sweden.

== Publications ==
While working as a research associate at AAAS, where she surveyed science education programs designed for minority students, a conference was held which Malcom helped to organize. The result of this conference was a landmark report co-authored by Malcom, entitled The Double Bind: The Price of Being a Minority Woman in Science (1976).

In 2003, the U.S. Supreme Court affirmed the importance of diverse learning environments, but dismissed formulaic and points-based approaches to undergraduate admissions to achieve this diversity. In response in 2004, AAAS issued a report titled Standing Our Ground: A Guidebook for STEM Educators in the Post-Michigan Era, written by Malcom, which clarifies legally plausible options for preserving diversity in engineering and science programs.

== Works ==
- Malcom, S.M.; Brown, J.W.; Hall, P.Q. (1976). The Double Bind; the Price of Being a Minority Woman in Science: Report of a Conference of Minority Women Scientists ... Warrenton, Virginia, December, 1975. AAAS publication 76-R-3. American Association for the Advancement of Science.
- "Shirley Malcom Wants Science Students to See the Big Picture". Science Spectrum. Vol. 2. Career Communications Group. 2005. p. 20.
- Malcom, S.M.; Chubin, D.E.; Jesse, J.K. (2004). Standing Our Ground: A Guidebook for STEM Educators in the Post-Michigan Era. American Association for the Advancement of Science, National Action Council for Minorities in Engineering. ISBN 978-0-87168-699-2.
