= Kennard Baker Bork =

American geologist

Kennard Baker Bork (born October 13, 1940, died July 27, 2025) is a retired university teacher of geology and geography from the United States. He graduated with a BA from DePauw University in 1962 then went on to obtain an MA (1964) and a PhD (1967) from Indiana University Bloomington. He ended a career stretching more than 35 years as Alumni Professor at Denison University in Granville, Ohio.

== Awards ==
Bork has been honored not only for his solid record as an undergraduate geoscience teacher but also for his contributions to the study of the history and development of geology. In 1997 the Geological Society of America (GSA) awarded him the History of Geology Award, normally granted to scholars affiliated with much larger universities. And in 2000 Bork was awarded the Neil Miner Award for "contributions to the stimulation of interest in Earth Science" by the National Association of Geoscience Teachers. He is a Fellow of the GSA.

== Publications ==
Bork's several dozen professional publications includes articles relating to sedimentology, stratigraphy, paleontology, historical geology and paleoecology. One of Bork's most notable academic accomplishments was the publication of the book Cracking Rocks and Defending Democracy (published by the American Association for the Advancement of Science in 1994) on geologist and social activist Kirtley F. Mather (1888-1978).
