= Michael B. Yaffe =

Scientific journal editor and professor

- Education: Cornell University (BS); Case Western Reserve University (MD, PhD)
- Occupations: Professor, surgeon, scientist
- Scientific career
- Fields: Biological Engineering; Trauma surgery
- Institutions: Massachusetts Institute of Technology; Harvard Medical School
- Military service
- Allegiance: United States
- Branch: United States Army
- Rank: Colonel
- Conflicts: War in Afghanistan
- Awards: Bronze Star (1)

Michael B. Yaffe is an American scientist, professor, surgeon, and retired U.S. Army Reserve Medical Corps colonel. He is currently the David H. Koch Professor of Biology & Biological Engineering at MIT and a trauma surgeon at the Beth Israel Deaconess Medical Center. In 2016, the United States Army awarded him the Bronze Star Medal for his services as a trauma surgeon on active duty in Afghanistan. He also treated many of the victims of the Boston Marathon bombing.

== Early life and education ==
Yaffe graduated from Pikesville High School in Baltimore, MD in 1977. He received a B.S. in Materials Science & Engineering from Cornell University in 1981, and his Ph.D. and M.D. from Case Western Reserve University in 1987 and 1989, respectively. He then completed a residency at University Hospitals Cleveland Medical Center and Beth Israel Deaconess Medical Center, as well as a postdoctoral fellowship at Harvard Medical School.

== Research ==
The main focus of Yaffe's research is decoding natural cell signaling pathway behavior using bioinformatics, combinatorial chemistry, cell biology, physical biochemistry, structural biology and molecular genetics. The stated goal of his team's research is to "understand how signaling pathways are integrated at the molecular and systems level to control cellular responses."

== Career ==
Besides his professorship at MIT, Yaffe is also an attending surgeon at the Beth Israel Deaconess Medical Center, a teaching hospital of Harvard Medical School, and the Chief Scientific Editor of the peer-reviewed science journal Science Signaling, published by the American Association for the Advancement of Science. He is a co-founder of Consensus Pharmaceuticals, Merrimack Pharmaceuticals, On-Q-ity, the DNA Repair Company, Applied Biomath, and Thrombo-Therapeutics where he also serves as a member of its scientific advisory board.

He currently has a number of highly cited articles. Two of Yaffe's papers have over 850 citations, and several others have over 400 citations.
