= SAGE KE =

Former online scientific resource

The Science of Aging Knowledge Environment (SAGE KE) was an online scientific resource provided by the American Association for the Advancement of Science (AAAS).

== History and organization ==
The American Association for the Advancement of Science established a collaboration with Stanford University Libraries and The Center for Resource Economics/Island Press (Island Press) in 1996 to find means to utilize internet-based technologies to enhance access to scientific information and improve the effectiveness of information transfer. The collaborative coined the term Knowledge Environment (KE) to describe the collection of electronic networking tools they were seeking to develop.

SAGE KE is the third in a series of Knowledge Environments developed by Science and AAAS, after the Signal Transduction Knowledge Environment (STKE) and AIDScience. Funding for SAGE KE comes from The Ellison Medical Foundation, founded and supported by Oracle Corporation CEO Larry Ellison.

SAGE KE published its final issue on 28 June 2006 due to lack of funding. The interactive content was discontinued during the summer of 2006, leaving the SAGE KE site as an archive by August 2006.

== Activities ==
The focus of SAGE KE was to provide timely access to information about advances on basic mechanisms of aging and age-related diseases through the internet, to provide searchable databases of information on aging and to provide an active environment in which biogerontologists could share and debate their understandings.

== Ouroboros ==
Ouroboros is a WordPress community weblog devoted to research in the biology of aging. It was established in July 2006 in reaction to the termination of the SAGE KE. The primary mission of the site is to provide timely commentary and review of recently published articles in the scholarly literature, either directly or indirectly related to aging. Articles on the site discuss a range of scientific topics, including Alzheimer's disease, bioinformatics, calorie restriction, regulation of gene expression, the role of mitochondria in the aging process, and evolutionary theories of aging.

== See also ==
- Ageing
- American Aging Association
- Biogerontology
- Science
- Senescence
