= Early Career Award for Public Engagement with Science =

Annual award for early-career scientists from the AAAS

AAAS Early Career Award for Public Engagement with Science
- Awarded for: Excellence in public engagement with science by an early-career scientist or engineer
- Country: United States
- Presented by: American Association for the Advancement of Science (AAAS)
- Rewards: $5,000 and a commemorative plaque
- First award: 2010
- Website: www.aaas.org/awards/early-career-public-engagement/about

The AAAS Early Career Award for Public Engagement with Science is an annual award presented by the American Association for the Advancement of Science (AAAS). Established in 2010, it recognizes early-career scientists and engineers for excellence in public engagement with science. The recipient is recognized at the AAAS Annual Meeting and receives a US$5,000 monetary prize and a commemorative plaque.

== Overview ==
The award was established by the American Association for the Advancement of Science (AAAS) in 2010 to recognize early-career scientists and engineers for excellence in public engagement with science. It is presented annually at the AAAS Annual Meeting.

The award is open to individual scientists, mathematicians, and engineers conducting research in STEM disciplines, including the social sciences and medicine. Eligible nominees must have completed their terminal degree within seven years of the nomination deadline and be actively engaged in research. Groups and organizations, current students, and AAAS employees are not eligible.

Nominations may be submitted by individuals or organizations, including self-nominations, and previously nominated candidates and finalists may be nominated again in subsequent years. According to AAAS, eligible public engagement activities extend beyond the nominee's formal job responsibilities. Nomination materials include a statement describing the nominee's public engagement activities together with supporting documentation.

== Recipients ==
| Year | Recipient | Affiliation (at time of award) | Notable engagement work |
|---|---|---|---|
| 2026 | Linda Lara-Jacobo | San Diego State University, Imperial Valley | Community-based participatory science on climate vulnerability, air and water pollution, and occupational health in U.S.–Mexico border communities. |
| 2025 | Barrak Alahmad | Harvard T.H. Chan School of Public Health | Engagement on the health effects of extreme heat on vulnerable populations, including migrant workers in Kuwait; testimony before the United Kingdom Parliament. |
| 2024 | Ana Maria Porras | University of Florida | Multilingual science communication, crochet microbiology, and partnerships with science clubs in Colombia. |
| 2023 | Jaye Gardiner | Fox Chase Cancer Center | Comics-based science communication and outreach through an undergraduate biology club, including work at correctional facilities and middle schools. |
| 2022 | Kizzmekia Corbett | Harvard T.H. Chan School of Public Health | Public engagement on SARS-CoV-2 vaccines with underserved Black communities through churches, town halls, and social media. |
| 2021 | Annette S. Lee | St. Cloud State University | Culturally responsive astronomy education using Indigenous knowledge systems and work with Native communities, educators, and museums. |
| 2020 | John Drazan | University of Pennsylvania (Human Motion Lab) | Sports biomechanics research linked to STEM outreach for underserved youth; co-founded 4th Family Inc. and the Court Science Academy. |
| 2019 | Mónica Ramírez-Andreotta | University of Arizona (Dept. of Soil, Water and Environmental Science) | Community-based participatory research on soil and food quality with communities affected by pollution, poor water quality, and food insecurity. |
| 2018 | Johanna Varner | Colorado Mesa University | Citizen science programs on pika research and climate-change awareness. |
| 2017 | No award given | — | Due to a change in naming convention, no award was presented in 2017. |
| 2016 | Suzi Gage | University of Bristol | Science communication through a blog, the Say Why to Drugs podcast, and public lectures. |
| 2015 | Mark Rosin | UCLA (Dept. of Mathematics) | Public engagement aimed at audiences not already seeking science; trained more than 100 scientists in public engagement. |
| 2014 | Shane Bergin | Trinity College Dublin | DARTofPhysics and other outreach on Dublin's rapid-transit system. |
| 2013 | Mary Helen Immordino-Yang | University of Southern California | Public engagement integrated with neuroscience research, including K–12 lab visits and internships for students. |
| 2012 | Daniel Heller | Koch Institute for Integrative Cancer Research, Massachusetts Institute of Technology | Cancer nanotechnology outreach and science communication. |
| 2011 | Albert Lin | University of California, San Diego and National Geographic Society Engineers for Exploration Program | Crowdsourced citizen science for geographic exploration, including Tomnod and the search for Genghis Khan's tomb. |
| 2010 | Lynford L. Goddard | University of Illinois Urbana-Champaign | Engagement with high school students through electrical engineering activities. |

== Finalists ==
AAAS began publicly naming finalists in select years. The following finalists have been confirmed on the official AAAS recipients page. Finalists are listed in no particular order per AAAS.

=== 2021 ===
| Finalist | Affiliation |
|---|---|
| Mayank Kejriwal | USC Information Sciences Institute, University of Southern California - the first USC faculty member named a finalist in the award's history |
| Dorsa Amir | Boston College |
| Elena Maria Blanco-Suarez | Salk Institute |
| Bárbara Isabela Escobar Anleu | Jaguar Corridor Initiative |
| Katherine Bouman | California Institute of Technology |
| Natalie Exner Dean | University of Florida |
| Elise S. Gornish | University of Arizona |

=== 2020 ===
| Finalist | Affiliation |
|---|---|
| Julie Maldonado | Livelihoods Knowledge Exchange Network (LiKEN) |

== See also ==
- American Association for the Advancement of Science
- AAAS Mani L. Bhaumik Award for Public Engagement with Science
- Public engagement with science
- Science communication
