= Renaissance (Bakalar) =

Public artwork in Washington, D.C.

- Artist: David Bakalar
- Year: 1989
- Type: Granite & Gold
- Dimensions: 120 cm (48 in)
- Location: Washington, D.C., United States; 38°54′0.63″N 77°1′41.34″W
- Owner: American Association for the Advancement of Science

Renaissance is a public artwork by American artist David Bakalar, located at the American Association for the Advancement of Science in Washington, D.C., United States.

== Description ==
Renaissance consists of two granite pieces placed upon a stone display. The proper left piece is shaped like an obelisk cut in half placed on the diagonal on the display. Its tip is a gold triangle. The proper right piece features a granite sphere resting on a triangular shaped pedestal. The tip of the obelisk is close to the sphere, a few inches from touching the ball. It aims towards a gold disk placed on the sphere. The sculpture sits outside the entrance to the William T. Golden Center for Science and Engineering.

== Artist ==
David Bakalar was a physicist before becoming a sculptor. With degrees from Harvard University and Massachusetts Institute of Technology, science influences his creation process. Founder of Transitron Electronic Corporation, his work specialized in transistor design and manufacturing, his tenure lasted thirty years before devoting himself to sculpture.

His work is in the collections of MIT, Massachusetts College of Art, Brandeis University, Columbia University Law School and others.

Bakalar describes his work: "I've always been fascinated by the codes and molecules that are the Life Force. My sculptures, subject to multiple interpretations, abstractly reflect the complexity of this force and our common identity with all of nature."

== Acquisition ==
The piece was donated in September 1999 by the artist for permanent display at AAAS. Its dedication coincided with an exhibit of Bakalar's work that ran through February 2000 at AAAS.

== See also ==
- List of public art in Washington, D.C., Ward 2
