= Transitron Electronic Corporation =

Transitron advertisement from 1960

Transitron Electronic Corporation was a semiconductor device fabrication company of the United States. It was founded by Leo and David Bakalar incorporated in Wakefield, Massachusetts, in 1952. David Bakalar was the president from 1952 to 1984. In 1986 the company went out of business, failing to keep pace with the rapid advances in technology.

== History ==
The company was established at the time of the economic boom in Massachusetts. Its first successful product was the gold bonded germanium diode, widely used in computers, military equipment, etc. After that the company manufactured silicon rectifiers (which David claims were the world's first ones), grown junction silicon NPN transistors, silicon diodes, germanium diodes, silicon/germanium micro-diodes, silicon references, silicon regulators, silicon controlled rectifiers, bilateral switching diodes, etc.

At its heyday Transitron employed 1,600 people. In 1959 Time Magazine reported it was number 3 American semiconductor company, after Texas Instruments and General Electric, while Fortune Magazine placed it at number 2, with estimated 1959 sales of $40 million. A number of senior industry persons, including Wilfred Corrigan, Dave Fullagar, Pierre Lamond, Nick DeWolf, George Wells, and Thomas Longo used to work in Transitron.

In December 1959 the company went public, with IPO of 1,000,000 shares at $36 each. The first week closed at $43 per share.

After going out of business, David Bakalar devoted his time to sculpture; see Renaissance (1989) and TV Man or Five Piece Cube with Strange Hole (1993).

=== Demise ===
By 1986, not being successful in the semiconductor and transistor industry, the company became indebted and sold one of its subsidiary to EF Hutton as part of buyout and soon went out of business.
