= University of East London =

Public university in London, England

- Coat of arms
- Motto: Latin: Scientia et votorum impletio
- Motto in English: Knowledge and the fulfilment of vows
- Type: Public
- Established: 1898 – West Ham Technical Institute; 1952 – West Ham College of Technology; 1970 – North East London Polytechnic; 1989 – Polytechnic of East London; 1992 – gained university status
- Affiliations: MillionPlus; Association of Commonwealth Universities; Universities UK; EUA
- Chairperson: Anulika Ajufo
- Chancellor: Aamer Sarfraz, Baron Sarfraz
- Vice-Chancellor: Amanda Broderick
- Academic staff: 716
- Students: 26,755 (2024/25)
- Undergraduates: 15,045 (2024/25)
- Postgraduates: 11,710 (2024/25)
- Location: London, United Kingdom; 51°30′28″N 0°3′49″E
- Campus: Urban
- Colours: Teal, black and white
- Website: uel.ac.uk

The University of East London (UEL) is a public university located in the London Borough of Newham, London, England, based at three campuses in Stratford and Docklands, following the opening of University Square Stratford in September 2013. The University of East London began as the West Ham Technical Institute and it was officially opened in October 1898 after approval was given for the construction of the site by the West Ham Technical Instruction Act Committee in 1892 following the Technical Instruction Act 1889. It gained university status in 1992. It was formerly known as College of East London.

The community is made up of over 40,000 students from over 160 countries studying at the University of East London and collaborative partners.

== History ==
West Ham Technical Institute (November 1898)

UEL can trace its roots back to 1892, when the newly formed County Borough of West Ham decided to establish a West Ham Technical Institute to serve the local community. The institute was to be, in the words of John Passmore Edwards speaking at the building's opening ceremony, a "people's university". The college provided courses in science, engineering and art, and also established its own internal degree courses in science and engineering, which were ratified by the University of London. In addition, it had a women's department.

As demand for technical education grew throughout the 1930s and 1940s, Essex County Council created two further colleges at Walthamstow and Dagenham (South West Essex Technical College and South East Essex Technical College). In 1970 these three colleges (West Ham, Walthamstow, Dagenham) were combined as a merger of higher education colleges, to create the North East London Polytechnic. Campuses were modernised and revitalised by buildings such as the Arthur Edwards building on the Stratford campus, completed in 1982.

In 1988 the North East London Polytechnic became a higher education institution, and was renamed the Polytechnic of East London in 1989.

In 1992 the Polytechnic of East London became the University of East London, one of a number of "new universities". UEL's succession of founding institutions exemplify the developments that took place in British further and higher education policy throughout the late 19th and 20th centuries. The University of East London consisted of the Barking Campus (closed 2006) and the Stratford Campus. In 1999 the Docklands Campus was opened, the first new university campus built in London for over 50 years.

In 2012, following previous opposition, UEL adopted the full increased tuition rates of £9,000 permitted by legislation enacted in 2010, an increase from the previous rate of £3,290. The university is a lead academic sponsor of Hackney University Technical College which opened in 2012, one of the first university technical colleges in England.

In April 2013 the university was granted armorial bearings by the College of Arms.

== Campuses ==
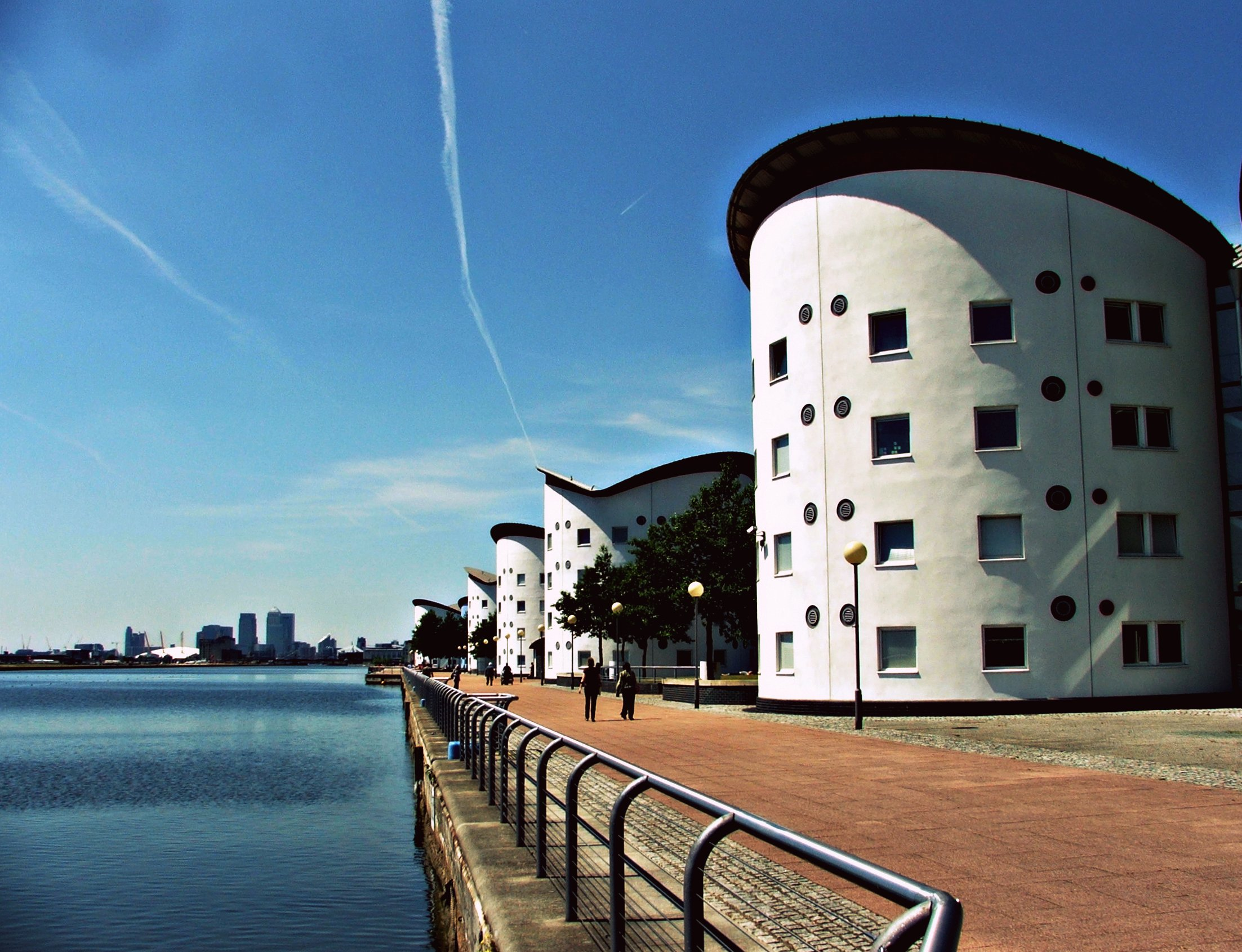
UEL Student Housing Looking Towards Canary Wharf

UEL has three campuses, at Stratford and Docklands, the newest of which, University Square Stratford, opened in September 2013. The Barking campus was closed in 2006.

UEL delivers programmes and short courses at the Barking Learning Centre in a nearby borough. Off campus, there are students registered on programmes with UK and non-UK academic partners, such as the Women's Institute of Management in Malaysia.

UCFB is a college of the university.

=== Stratford Campus ===
The Stratford Campus is close to the 2012 Olympic Park. It is centred around University House, a 19th-century listed building. The campus is home to the School of Education and Communities, the School of Health Sport and Bioscience and the School of Psychology. The Centre for Clinical Education was opened in January 2008. Operating in partnership with the National Health Service, the centre is London's only provider of podiatric education.

In 2011 UEL appointed Make Architects to lead the design of a replacement library at the Stratford Campus. The project had a budget of £13 million and the library opened in June 2013.

=== Docklands Campus ===
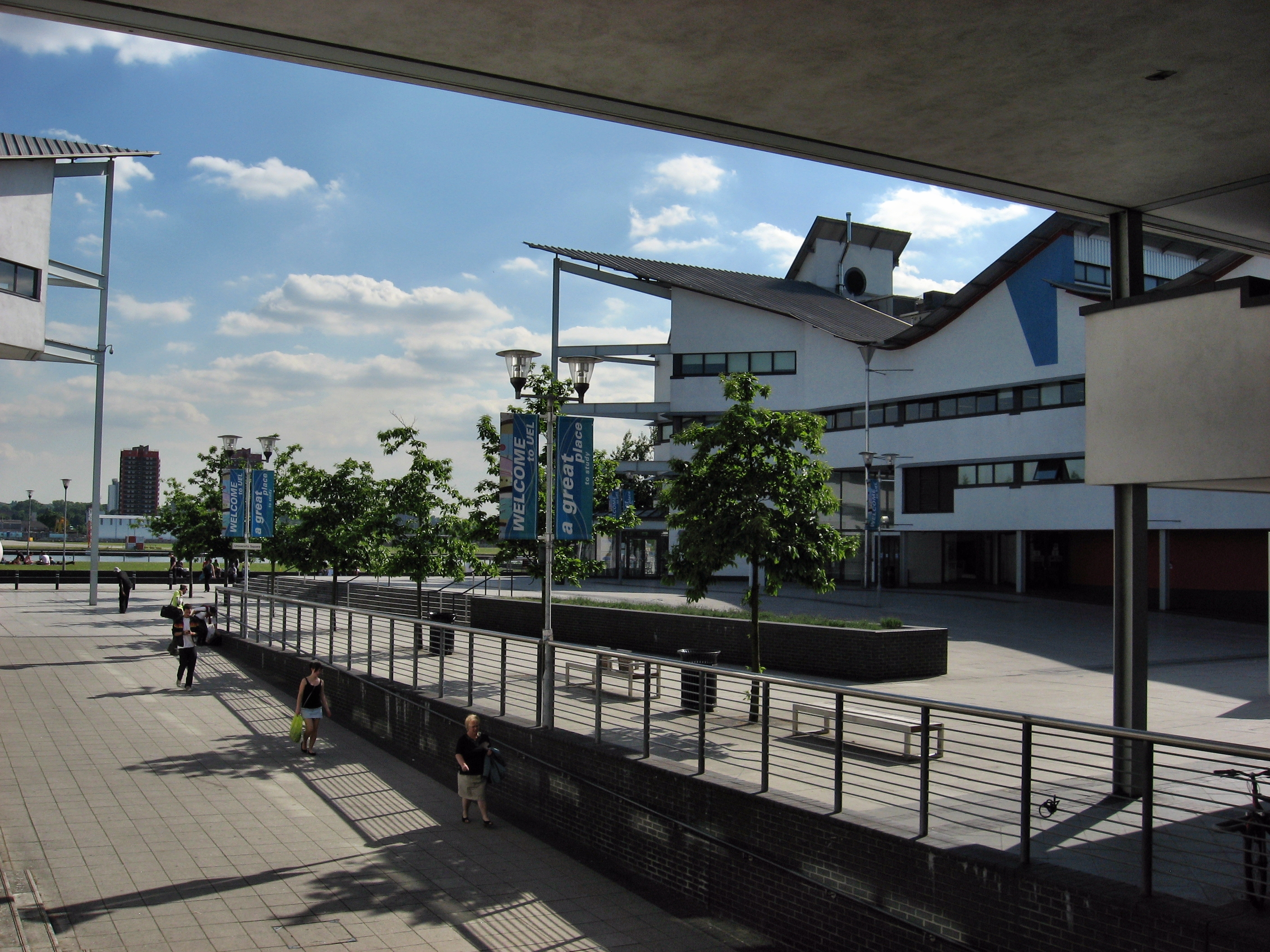
University Square, Docklands Campus

The Docklands Campus, opened in 1999, is the largest of the three campuses. It is at the Royal Albert Dock in the redeveloped Docklands area of east London. Royal Albert Dock has been closed to commercial shipping since the 1980s and is now largely used as a water sports centre and rowing course, for example for the London Regatta Centre.

London City Airport is across the dock from the campus. The Cyprus station of the Docklands Light Railway is adjacent to the campus, and offers links to Canary Wharf and central London.

The campus was shortlisted for the Royal Institution of Chartered Surveyors' Building of the Year in 2001.

New student accommodation opened in 2008 and the campus now has 1,200 student rooms, together with shops, cafés and a restaurant, launderettes and an open-air fitness suite. SportsDock, a £21 million sports and academic centre, opened in March 2012. SportsDock served as the High-Performance Training Centre for Team USA during the London 2012 Olympic Games. The campus library is housed in the Royal Docks Business School building.

=== University Square Stratford ===
A third campus, University Square Stratford (USS – not to be confused with University Square at the Docklands Campus), opened for the 2013–14 academic year. The building opened being co-owned with Birkbeck, University of London it is situated in Stratford and delivers part-time and full-time study for adults. The project was the first time two higher education institutions created a new shared building. The building provides shared teaching spaces for both higher education institutions and their partners. It is home to the Royal Docks School of Business Law, as well as UEL's Institute of Performing Arts. Facilities include performance studios, editing suites, a mooting room and lecture theatres.

In July 2021, the university bought the remaining shares in University Square as part of their Vision 2028 strategy, to "boost careers-led education", this enabled the UEL's Royal Docks School of Business and Law facility within USS to be further enhanced by a trading floor simulator, a mooting room, and a marketing analytics lab.

The building was nominated for the 2014 Carbuncle Cup.

== Organisation ==
=== Faculties and schools ===
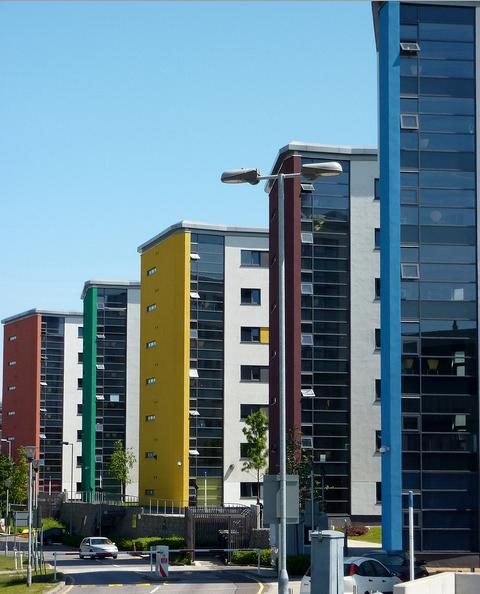
Docklands Campus student accommodation

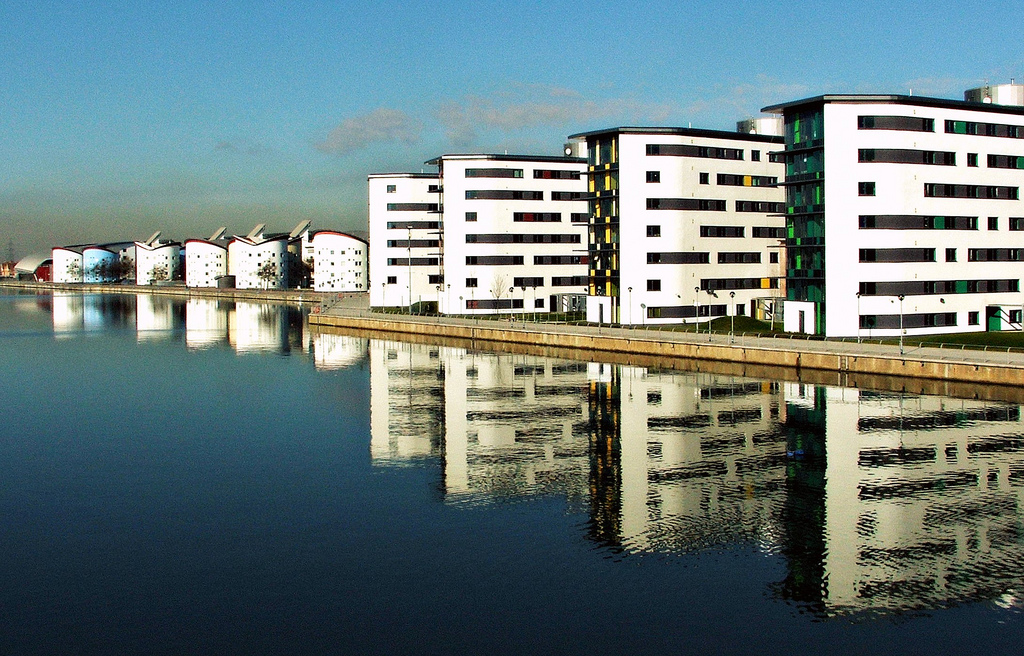
Docklands Campus

Degree programmes and other courses are taught by one of the seven teaching schools. In addition, the Graduate School provides support and administrative services for postgraduate research students.

==== Royal Docks School of Business and Law ====
The School of Business and Law (RDBSL) is a combined school which offers undergraduate, postgraduate and PhD degree programmes, as well as non-degree executive education for individuals and companies. The school's main location is at the Stratford Campus but it also offers programmes at the Docklands Campus. Its programmes are recognised by professional bodies including the Association of Chartered Certified Accountants, (ACCA), the Chartered Management Institute (CMI), and the Chartered Institute of Personnel and Development, (CIPD).

The school also offers a range of business support, enterprise development services and conferencing facilities. Knowledge Dock helps students start their own companies by supplying help and business start-up incubators. Knowledge Dock is accredited by the European Business Network as a Business Innovation Centre (BIC) and is the only BIC in London, and one of only 12 in the UK.

==== School of Architecture, Computing and Engineering ====
The School of Architecture, Computing and Engineering was established in 2011. It delivers undergraduate programmes in architecture, computing, civil engineering, electrical and electronic engineering, mathematics and product design.

==== School of Education and Communities ====
The School of Education and Communities delivers teaching and supports research in comparative education, early childhood, diversity and language, multilingualism, professional education, race and community, social work, teacher education and technology-enhanced learning.

==== School of Health, Sport and Bioscience ====
The School of Health, Sport and Bioscience supports research and delivers teaching in nursing, health studies, physiotherapy, occupational therapy, microbiology, biomedical science, physiology, pharmacology, biochemistry, forensic science, sports science, conservation and ecology.

==== School of Psychology ====
The School of Psychology delivers programmes such as BSc (Hons) Psychology, accredited by the British Psychological Society, and a qualification in counselling training, BSc (Hons) Counselling and Mentoring.

==== School of Arts and Creative Industries ====
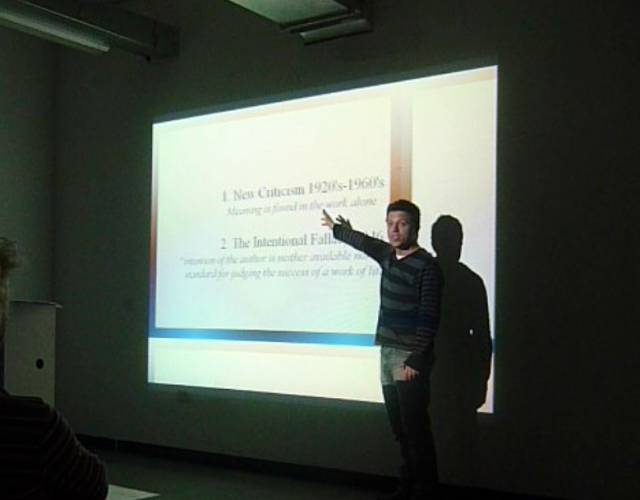
Lecture on Intentism at UEL

The School of Arts and Creative Industries delivers courses that cover fashion, film, design, fine art and media, digital arts and communications, games design and animation, music, theatre and dance, creative writing, cultural and heritage studies, journalism, advertising and performing arts.

==== Graduate school ====
The Graduate School provides support for postgraduate research students, research and scholarly activities.

== Validations ==
In 2018, UEL partnered with renowned theatre arts school Italia Conti Academy of Theatre Arts and became validators of their BA (Hons) Musical Theatre course. The course takes place at two locations; The academy, Barbican and Italia Conti Arts Centre, Guildford.

== Academic profile ==
Rankings
National rankings
- Complete (2027): 96
- Guardian (2027): 33
- Times / Sunday Times (2027): 58

Global rankings
- QS (2027): 1001–1200
- THE (2026): 1001–1200

UEL offers both undergraduate and postgraduate degrees. In addition, extended degree programmes are available for many of the single honour programmes. In these programmes, students add a preliminary foundation year to the usual three-year programme. UEL offers a range of postgraduate degrees, including taught master's degrees, professional doctorates and research degrees including MPhils and PhDs.

UEL has an MBA programme in Malaysia via collaboration with Women's Institute of Management Malaysia.

== London 2012 Olympic and Paralympic Games ==
UEL's campuses are in Newham, the host borough of the London 2012 Olympic and Paralympic Games, close to two Olympic venues; the Olympic Park in Stratford and the Excel Centre in Docklands. UEL has had Olympic and Paralympic projects including research, student involvement and sporting partnerships underway since it was announced that London's bid to host the Games was successful in 2005.

=== Partnerships ===
Asics had a five-year partnership with UEL, and provided bursaries and scholarships to support research athletes at the university. During the 2012 Games, ASICS played host to athletes, ambassadors and business partners in their brand centre at UEL's Stratford campus.

The London Organising Committee of the Olympic Games and Paralympic Games (LOCOG) was a Games-time partner with UEL and students volunteered as Games-makers during the Games.

British Swimming has had a partnership with UEL since the London Olympic Games in 2005. British Swimming used UEL residencies during the Games.

The United States Olympic Committee's Team USA used SportsDock as its training centre during the Games. UEL sites acted as a base for USOC's sports performance services, logistical operations and media relations. Michelle Obama addressed the Team USA athletes at the SportsDock facility on Friday, 27 July 2012, speaking of the pride and excitement that the Games bring to people.

UEL students volunteered with Team USA in a number of roles during the Olympic season, including writing for the team's Games-time publication.

Team Singapore (SSC)'s recovery centre was based at UEL, providing high-performance athletic services including an athletes' lounge. UEL also provided accommodation for SSC's medical team.

=== Research ===
In the seven years to 2012, UEL produced around 70 pieces of research work, including the Westfield Transport Observation, Newham Impact Evaluation and LOCOG Impact Evaluation.

== Student life ==
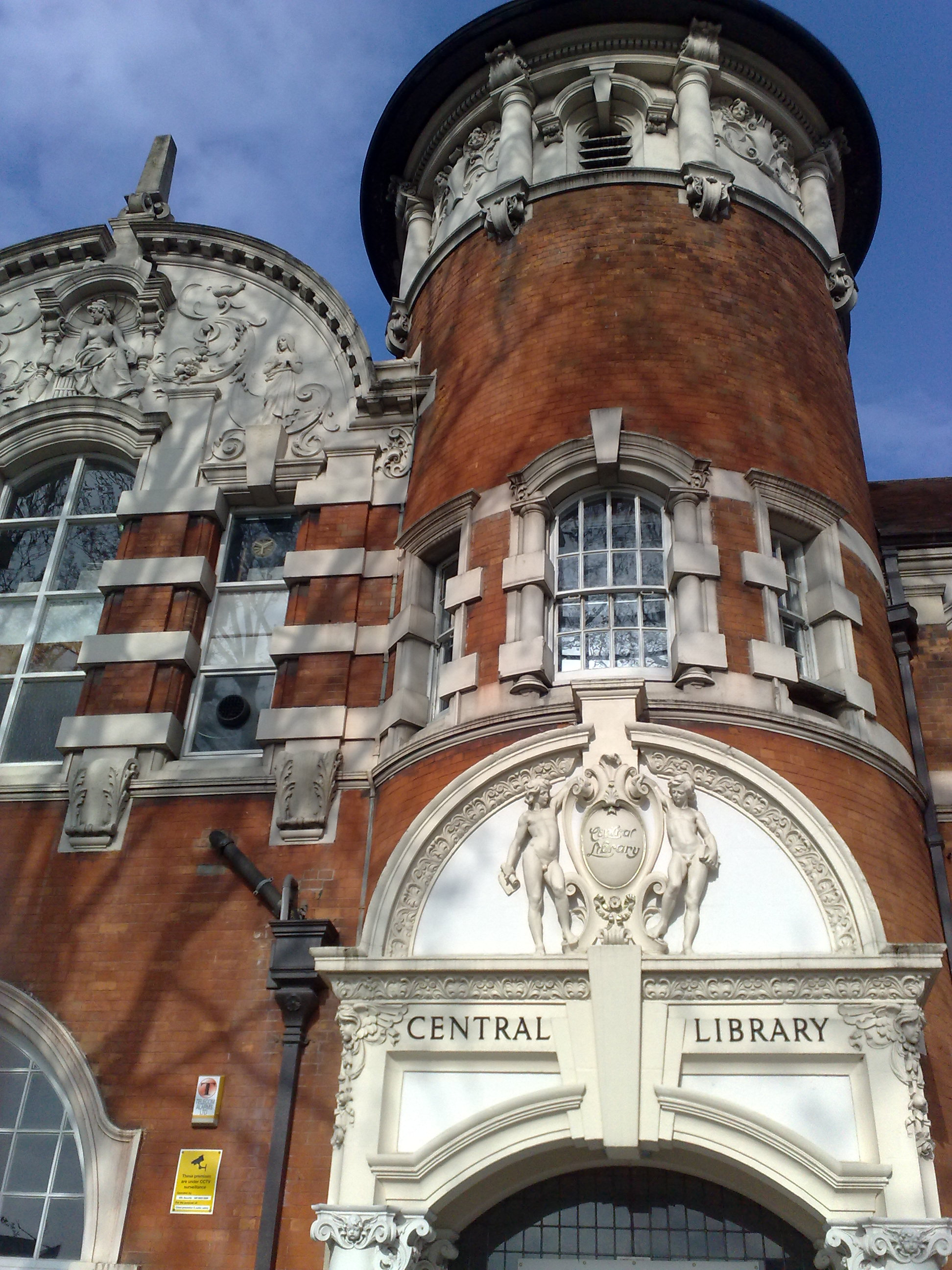
Stratford Library

=== Students' Union ===
The University of East London Students' Union (UELSU) is the university-wide representative body for students at the university. It exists to represent UEL students in university decision-making, to act as the voice of students in the national higher education policy debate, and to provide direct services to the student body. It is affiliated to the National Union of Students, which represents students nationwide. Elections are held every year to elect a new executive committee. The Students' Union runs a number of clubs and societies, campaigns and entertainment. There is also a social meeting space, on the Docklands campus and another, the Dome, on the Stratford campus

There are over 50 societies at UEL. There is a student e-zine called Your Universe, a joint partnership between UEL and student writers.

=== Sports ===
UEL's sports clubs participate in the British Universities and Colleges Sport leagues and sports activities are managed by UELSports. In 2011, UEL was named the most improved university for sport at the BUCS awards, having jumped 43 places in the league table.

A sports centre at the Docklands campus, Sportsdock, opened in 2012. This was used by Team USA for their training during the 2012 Summer Olympics. The centre features a gym and fitness suite, two large indoor sports arenas, ten badminton courts, two competition basketball courts, volleyball and netball courts, cricket bays, two five-a-side football pitches, a sports café and covered seating for 400 people.

== Notable alumni ==
UEL and its predecessor institutions have a number of notable academic staff and alumni, including politicians, business people, authors, actors, musicians and sports people.

- Kemi Adeosun – Minister of Finance of Nigeria
- Tazeen Ahmad – British journalist and broadcaster
- Hilary Armstrong – British Labour Party politician and formerly Member of Parliament
- Roger Ashton-Griffiths – British actor, writer and director
- Nigel Benson – author and illustrator
- Garry Bushell – British journalist and broadcaster
- Simon Carter – Artist
- Marina Diamandis – Marina and the Diamonds, singer-songwriter
- Jake and Dinos Chapman – Turner Prize nominees
- Daljit Dhaliwal – news presenter for Al Jazeera English
- Mark Frith – journalist and editor (did not graduate)
- Gemma Gibbons – Judo Olympian
- Preet Kaur Gill – British Labour Co-operative politician, MP for Birmingham Edgbaston
- Max Hattler, visual artist, animator
- Rupa Huq – British Labour Party politician and Member of Parliament
- Joe Ikhinmwin - former British Basketball League player and media personality
- Edison James – former Prime Minister of Dominica
- Danielle Jawando - British writer
- Carolyn Kagan – community psychologist and social activist
- Sonam Kapoor – Bollywood actress
- Imran Khan – solicitor to the Stephen Lawrence family
- Jeffrey Lawal-Balogun – track athlete
- Gina Miller – initiator of R (Miller) v Secretary of State for Exiting the European Union 2016 case against the British government over its authority to implement Brexit without approval from the House of Commons (did not graduate)
- Kenny Morris - first studio drummer of Siouxsie and the Banshees
- Kate Osamor – Labour Party politician and Member of Parliament
- Mike Pittilo – Principal and Vice-Chancellor of the Robert Gordon University
- Helen Pluckrose - British author and cultural writer known for critiques of Critical Social Justice
- Margaret Prosser, Baroness Prosser – Labour Life Peer and Deputy Chair of the Equality and Human Rights Commission
- Bill Puplampu – occupational psychologist and Vice Chancellor of the Central University (Ghana)
- Lucy Quist – first Ghanaian woman to become the CEO of a multinational telecommunications company in Ghana
- Mark Stephens – broadcaster, lawyer, mediator and writer
- Tinchy Stryder – musician
- Roger Taylor – drummer of the band Queen
- Alexander Trotman, Baron Trotman – former chairman and CEO of Ford Motor Company
- Dario Angelo Alberto Vignali - Distinguished Professor and the Frank Dixon Chair for Cancer Immunology at University of Pittsburgh
- Bianca Williams – Commonwealth Games track athlete
- Iolo Williams – Welsh nature observer and television presenter

== See also ==
- Armorial of UK universities
- List of universities in the UK
- Post-1992 universities
