= William D. Carey =

American publisher (1916–1998)

William D. Carey (January 29, 1916 – June 24, 1998) was Executive Officer of the American Association for the Advancement of Science and publisher of Science from 1975 through 1987.

He was born in the Bronx, raised in Boston, and educated at Columbia and Harvard. He joined the U.S. Bureau of the Budget in 1942, became executive assistant director in 1959 and assistant director in 1966. Carey left government in 1969, in part over his disagreement with what was then known as Reorganization Plan No. 2. The plan, adopted by President Nixon on July 1, 1970, as Executive Order 11541, divided the responsibilities of the Bureau of the Budget between a new Office of Management and Budget and what later became the Domestic Policy Council, and put both under firmer Presidential control. From 1969 to 1974 Carey occupied a senior position at Arthur D. Little, Inc In 1982, in the pages of Science, he debated with Frank Carlucci over the latter's concerns that scientific exchanges with the Soviet Union were being exploited militarily by the Soviets. Carey was awarded the Public Welfare Medal from the National Academy of Sciences in 1986. He died in Washington, D.C., at age 82.
