= William T. Golden Center for Science and Engineering =

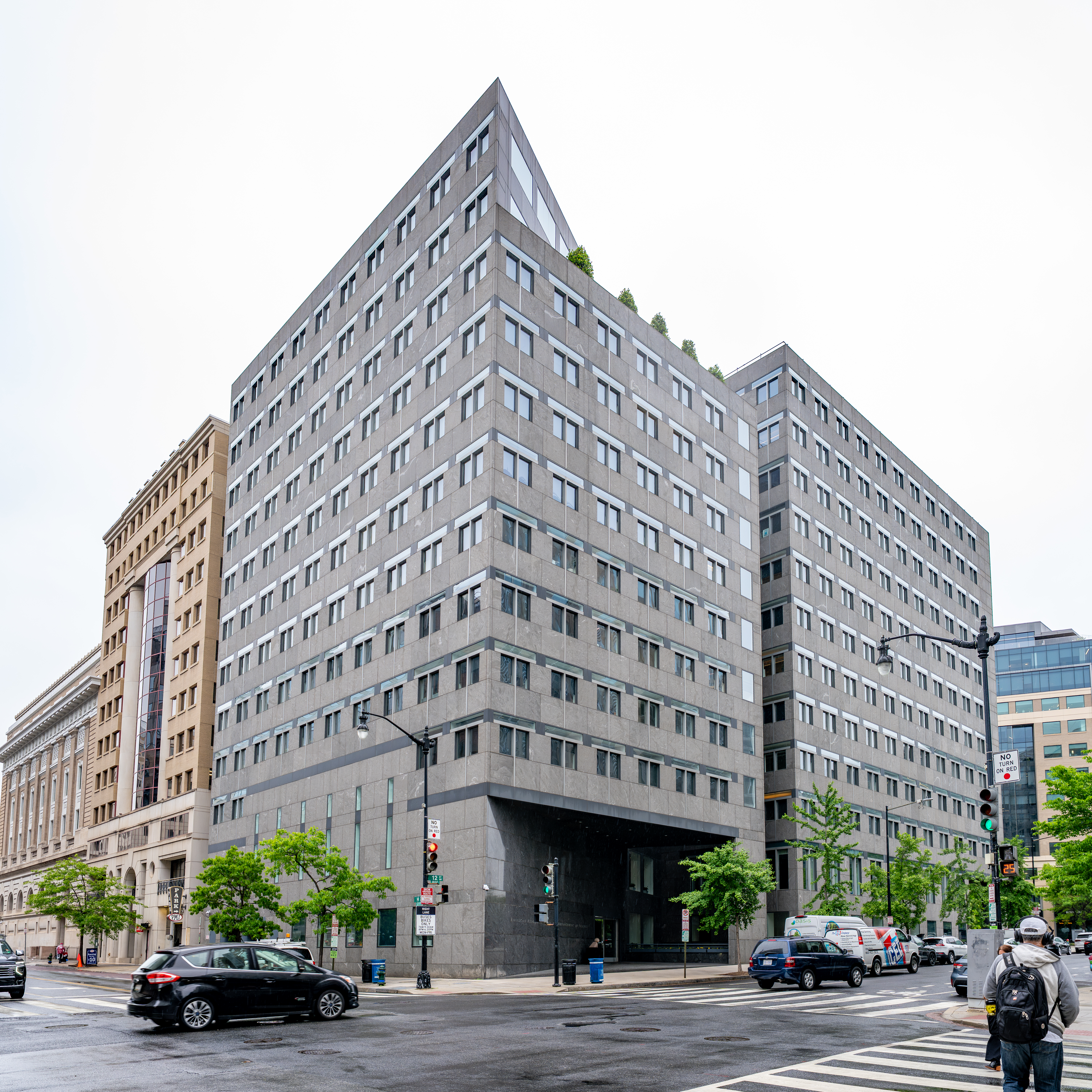
- Interactive map of the William T. Golden Center for Science and Engineering area

General information
- Type: Office
- Location: 1200 New York Ave NW Washington, D.C., U.S.
- Coordinates: 38°54′3″N 77°1′43″W
- Completed: 1996

Height
- Roof: 151 feet (46 m)

Technical details
- Floor count: 12

Design and construction
- Architects: Davis Carter Scott, Ltd., Pei Cobb Freed & Partners

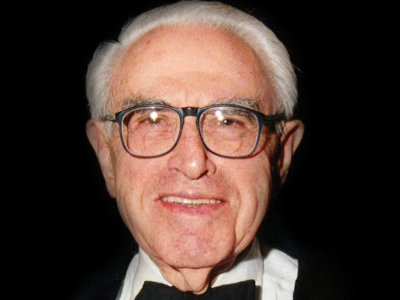
William T. Golden in a video tribute to the National Science Foundation

William T. Golden Center for Science and Engineering is a high-rise building in Washington, D.C., United States. Completed in 1996, the building rises to 151 feet (46 m) and has 12 floors. The architects of the building were Davis, Carter, Scott Ltd. and Pei Cobb Freed & Partners, who designed the postmodern building. This building is the headquarters to the American Association for the Advancement of Science, a non-profit organization established in 1848 that aims to advance science around the world. Other tenants include the Association of American Universities and the IRIS Consortium.

The building is named after William T. Golden.

== See also ==
- Renaissance (Bakalar)
- List of tallest buildings in Washington, D.C.
