= TV Man or Five Piece Cube with Strange Hole =

Sculpture in Cambridge, Massachusetts, U.S.

- The sculpture in 2019
- Artist: David Bakalar
- Year: 1993
- Medium: Granite sculpture
- Dimensions: 210 cm × 140 cm × 270 cm (82 in × 57 in × 105 in)
- Location: Cambridge, Massachusetts, US
- 42.358885°N 71.089064°W
- Owner: MIT List Visual Arts Center

TV Man or Five Piece Cube with Strange Hole is a 1993 mountain rose colored granite and steel sculpture by David Bakalar, installed on the Massachusetts Institute of Technology (MIT) campus, in Cambridge, Massachusetts, United States. The five abstract, organic elements of the sculpture reflect the influences of Constructivism and Surrealism on the artist's style. The geometric forms use negative space to help compose an anthropomorphic ensemble.

== See also ==
- 1993 in art
