= Science Immunology =

Scientific journal

- Discipline: Immunology
- Language: English
- Edited by: Holden Thorp

Publication details
- History: 2016-present
- Publisher: American Association for the Advancement of Science
- Frequency: Monthly
- Open access: Delayed, after 12 months
- Impact factor: 16.1 (2024)

Standard abbreviations
- ISO 4: Sci. Immunol.

Indexing
- CODEN: SICMCW
- ISSN: 2470-9468
- OCLC no.: 953845027

Links
- Journal homepage; Online access; Online archive

Science Immunology is a monthly peer-reviewed scientific journal covering all aspects of immunology in any model organism. It was established in 2016 and is published by the American Association for the Advancement of Science. The editor-in-chief is Holden Thorp.

== Abstracting and indexing ==
The journal is abstracted and indexed in:

- Biological Abstracts
- BIOSIS Previews
- Chemical Abstracts Service
- Embase
- Index Medicus/MEDLINE/PubMed
- Science Citation Index Expanded
- Scopus

According to the Journal Citation Reports, the journal has a 2024 impact factor of 16.1.
