= William T. Golden =

American banker

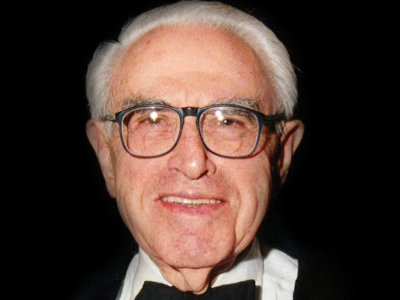
- Golden in 2009
- Born: October 25, 1909; New York City, U.S.
- Died: October 7, 2007 (aged 97); Manhattan, New York City, U.S.
- Occupations: Investment banker, Philanthropist, Science adviser

William T. Golden (October 25, 1909 – October 7, 2007) was an American investment banker, philanthropist, and science adviser.

Golden was born October 25, 1909, in New York City; his parents were both the children of poor Lithuanian immigrants to the U.S., and his father worked in the textile industry and later became a banker. He was an early fan of technology, and earned a ham radio license at the age of 13. He earned a baccalaureate in English and biology at the University of Pennsylvania, and then studied for a year at the Harvard Business School before beginning work for Harold F. Linder on Wall Street. Much later in his life, he earned a master's degree in biology from Columbia University in 1979, and five honorary doctorates.

During World War II, Golden worked for the U.S. Navy's Bureau of Ordnance, and helped develop antiaircraft gun firing technology. After the war, he worked with Lewis Strauss at the newly formed Atomic Energy Commission. In the 1950s, when president Harry Truman consulted Golden concerning the possible re-establishment of the wartime Office of Scientific Research and Development, Golden instead suggested appointing a science adviser to the president. Truman agreed, and the first science adviser was Oliver Ellsworth Buckley. Golden was also instrumental in establishing the National Science Foundation during Truman's term as president.

Golden served on the boards of directors of multiple businesses, agencies, and universities, including the Carnegie Institution for Science, the American Museum of Natural History, the Mount Sinai Hospital, New York, and the American Association for the Advancement of Science. The William T. Golden Center for Science and Engineering, the headquarters of the American Association for the Advancement of Science, was named after Golden in 1995. In 2001, Golden received the AAAS Lifetime Achievement Award from the American Association for the Advancement of Science. He was a member of the American Philosophical Society, the American Academy of Arts and Sciences, and the National Academy of Sciences.

Golden was married three times, to Sibyl Levy, with whom he had two daughters, to mathematician Jean Taylor, and to Catherine Morrison.
