= AlphaGalileo =

AlphaGalileo Foundation Ltd
- Website type: News
- Available in: English, Spanish, French and German
- Owner: Independent
- Website: www.alphagalileo.org
- Launched: 1998
- Current status: Active

AlphaGalileo is a business-to-business science news service launched in 1998. AlphaGalileo was created as a result of UK government efforts to promote public engagement with science.

== History ==
The service was founded in 1998 by Peter Green with the support of the Association of British Science Writers as well as support from the French and German ministries.

In 2014 they move from a foundation organization to AlphaGalileo, Ltd.

== Overview ==
The news service, which is moderated, is run by the independent organisation, AlphaGalileo Ltd. It takes press releases about research developments from over 2 000 contributors and distributes them to more than 7,000 journalists in some 85 countries.
