= Science Signaling =

- Discipline: Signal transduction, cellular processes
- Language: English
- Edited by: John F. Foley

Publication details
- Former name: Science's STKE
- History: 1999–present
- Publisher: American Association for the Advancement of Science (United States)
- Frequency: Weekly
- Impact factor: 6.7 (2023)

Standard abbreviations
- ISO 4: Sci. Signal.

Indexing
- ISSN: 1945-0877 (print); 1937-9145 (web)
- LCCN: 2008202065
- OCLC no.: 244485006
- Science's STKE
- ISSN: 1525-8882

Links
- Journal homepage; Online archive

Science Signaling is a peer-reviewed scientific journal that is focused on mechanisms of cell communication. It is published online weekly by the American Association for the Advancement of Science (AAAS). The editor-in-chief is John F. Foley, the Chief Scientific Advisor is Michael B. Yaffe (Massachusetts Institute of Technology), and the journal is part of the Science family of which Holden Thorp is the Editor-in-Chief.

== Scope ==
The journal covers research on cell signaling and the processes of cellular regulation. In addition, the journal covers signaling networks, synthetic biology, systems biology, drug discovery, and computation and modeling of regulatory pathways. Besides full length articles, it also publishes reviews, focus articles, and editor-written highlights of select research papers.

== History ==
The journal was established in 1999 as Science's STKE. On January 8, 2008, it obtained its current name and volume numbering restarted at 1. As Science's STKE, the journal's last issue was volume 2007, issue 417, on December 18, 2007.

== Abstracting and indexing ==
Science Signaling is abstracted and indexed by:

- Science Citation Index Expanded
- BIOSIS Previews
- MEDLINE
- PubMed
- Chemical Abstracts Service
- EMBASE
- GEOBASE
- Elsevier BIOBASE
- EMBiology
- EMCare
- Scopus

According to the Journal Citation Reports, the journal has a 2021 impact factor of 9.517.
