= Anton Julius Carlson =

Swedish-American physiologist (1875–1956)

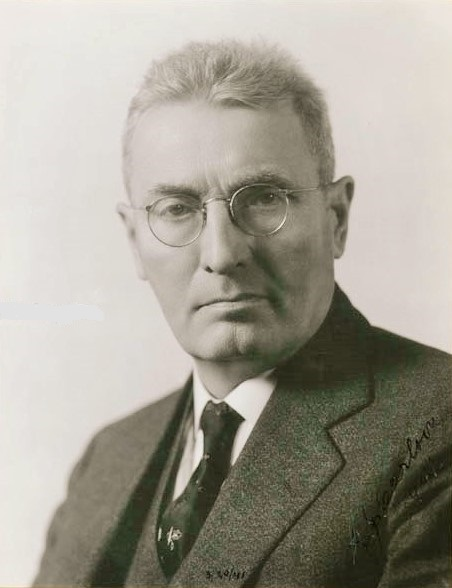
- Born: January 29, 1875; Svarteborg, Västra Götaland County, Sweden
- Died: September 2, 1956 (aged 81)
- Education: Stanford University
- Scientific career
- Fields: Physiology
- Workplaces: University of Chicago; American Physiological Society; AAAS; National Academy of Sciences

Anton Julius Carlson (January 29, 1875 – September 2, 1956) was a Swedish American physiologist. Carlson was chairman of the Physiology Department at the University of Chicago from 1916 until 1940.

== Biography ==
Carlson was born the son of Carl Jacobson and Hedvig Andersdotter in Svarteborg, in Västra Götaland County, Sweden. He came to the United States in 1891. He graduated from Augustana College in Rock Island, Illinois, (BA, 1898)(MS, 1899). He received a doctorate in physiology at Stanford in 1902 and began working at the University of Chicago in 1904. While Carlson was at Chicago, he conducted experiments on Fred Vlcek, similar to those conducted on Alexis St. Martin by William Beaumont, regarding his gastric fistula. These included illuminating his stomach with electric lights in order to observe digestion. Carlson became chairman of the physiology department at the University of Chicago in 1916 and remained chairman until 1940.

Carlson was elected to the United States National Academy of Sciences in 1920 and the American Philosophical Society in 1928. He was president of the American Physiological Society from 1923 to 1925, and president of the AAAS in 1944. Carlson was elected a foreign member of the Royal Swedish Academy of Sciences in 1929.

The cover story of the February 10, 1941, issue of Time magazine was devoted to Carlson's success as a teacher and his comparative studies of the muscular action of the heart in humans and the horseshoe crab. Carlson was one of 34 original signers of the Humanist Manifesto and in 1953 he was the first person to receive the American Humanist Association's Humanist of the Year award.

== Selected works ==
- The Control of Hunger In Health And Disease (University of Chicago Press. 1916)
- Organotherapeutics (D. Appleton and Company. 1924)
- The Machinery of the Body (University of Chicago Press, 1930). With Victor E. Johnson (1901-1986)

Preceded by Isaiah Bowman	President of the American Association for the Advancement of Science; 1944	Succeeded by James B. Conant
