= Karl Lark-Horovitz =

American physicist

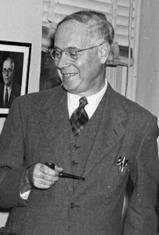
- 1947 at the AAAS
- Born: July 20, 1892; Vienna, Austria-Hungary
- Died: April 14, 1958 (aged 65); West Lafayette, Indiana
- Education: University of Vienna
- Scientific career
- Fields: Physics
- Workplaces: Purdue University
- Doctoral students: Hellmut Fritzsche

Karl Lark-Horovitz (July 20, 1892 – April 14, 1958) was an American physicist known for his pioneering work in solid-state physics that played a role in the invention of the transistor. He brought the previously neglected physics department at Purdue University to prominence during his tenure there as department head from 1929 until his death in 1958.

== Early years ==
Born Karl Horovitz in Vienna, Austria, on July 20, 1892, he was encouraged by both his father, Moritz, (dermatologist) and mother, Adele (Hofmann), to pursue varied scholarly interests. Horovitz choose to attend Humanistic School for secondary education. In 1929, Karl and his wife Betty Lark, an accomplished woodblock print artist, changed their family name to Lark-Horovitz.

== Academic Research ==
Prior to 1940s, Lark-Horovitz scientific research resulted in advancement of X-ray and electron diffraction methods for crystal structure determination. During World War II, Lark-Horovitz led the effort to study germanium for use in semiconductor devices. His work with collaborators at Purdue resulted in production of high-purity germanium, methods to control its electrical properties by doping and improvement of devices used in radars. After the war, he initiated efforts in studying effects of radiation on semiconductor materials and devices.
