= Fernandus Payne =

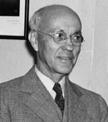
1947 at the AAAS

Fernandus Payne (February 13, 1881 – October 13, 1977) was an American zoologist, geneticist and educator.

Panye was born in Shelbyville, Indiana. He received a B.Sc. from Valparaiso University in 1901 and a B.A. from Indiana University Bloomington in 1905, and a M.A. in 1906. He undertook graduate studies at Columbia University with Thomas Hunt Morgan, his research took place when the use of fruit fly Drosophila melanogaster was being established in Morgan's lab. One of Payne's projects was to breed flies in the dark, if a generation of blind flies was produced then a model of Lamarckism would be confirmed. After producing 69 generation of flies grown in the dark Payne failed to produce a blind fly. Payne also helped Morgan produce X-ray mutagenised flies, these were used for many years to come in Morgans lab. Payne completed his PhD in 1909.

Payne returned to Indiana University where he was made associate professor. He remained at the university for the remainder of his career, he was credited with introducing genetics to the university and attracting other researchers to IU like Hermann Joseph Muller and Salvatore Luria who both became Nobel laureates.

Asteroid 2496 Fernandus, discovered October 8, 1953 by the Indiana Asteroid Program, is named for him.

He also served on the board of trustees for Science Service, now known as Society for Science & the Public, from 1953 to 1954.
