= Davis Center =

Ice rink and swimming pool in New York City

Coordinates: 40.796464°N 73.954626°W

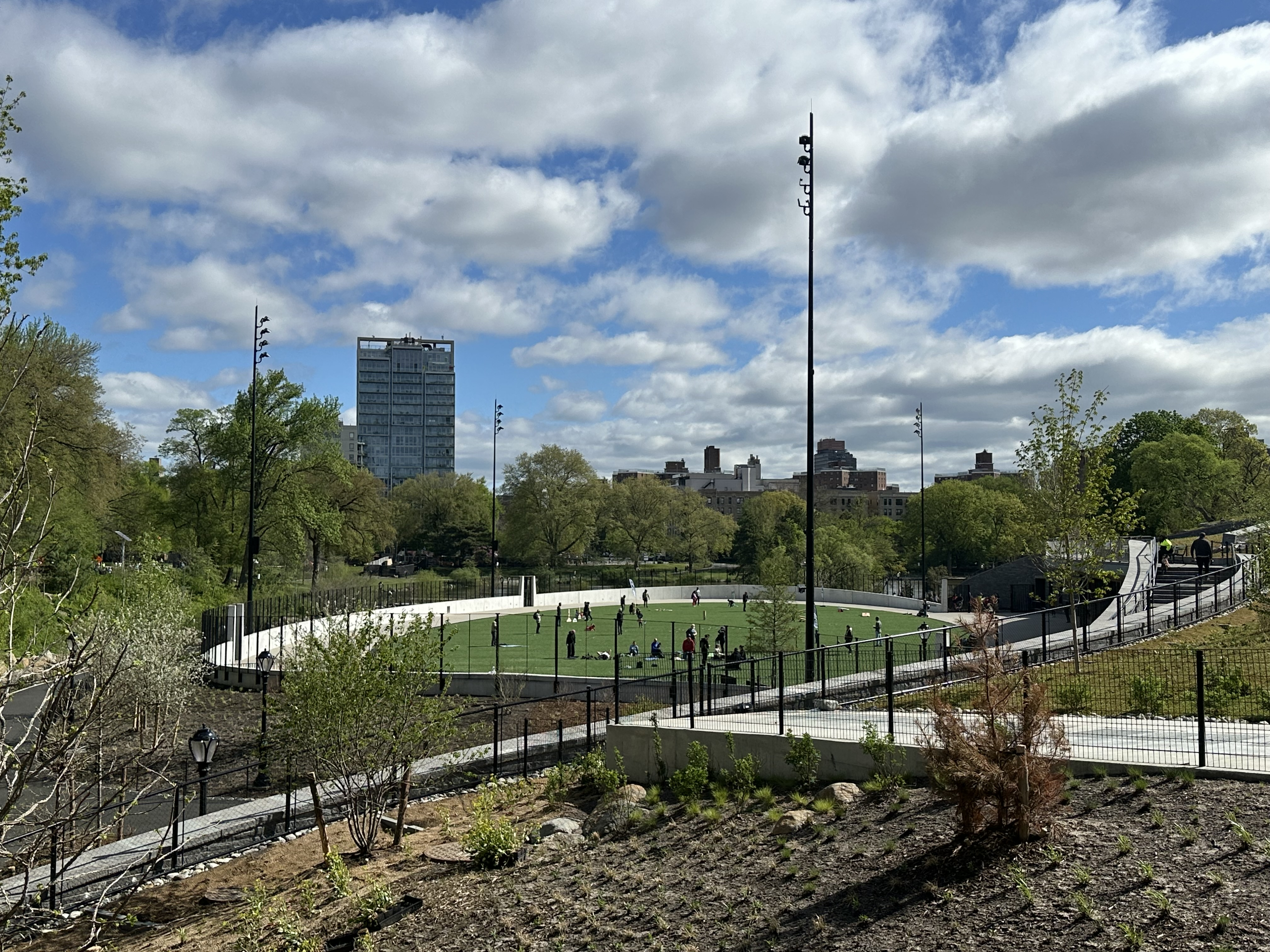
Davis Center as viewed from East Drive in 2025, the day after the opening.

Notable buildings and structures of Central Park. Click on the map and then on the points for details.

The Davis Center (formally the Davis Center at the Harlem Meer) is a seasonal ice skating rink and swimming pool at the southwest corner of the Harlem Meer in the northern part of Central Park in Manhattan, New York City. Completed in 2025, it was built on the site of Lasker Rink (formally known as the Loula D. Lasker Memorial Swimming Pool and Skating Rink). The original rink, designed by the architects Fordyce & Hamby Associates, operated from 1966 to 2021 and was demolished after its final operating season.

== History ==
=== Early history ===
The Davis Center and Lasker Rink site is located in the northernmost section of Central Park, north of 106th Street. In 1962, the New York City Department of Parks and Recreation announced plans to build a swimming pool and ice skating rink in this area to cost $1.8 million. The rink would be built above the mouth of the Loch, at the southwestern corner of Harlem Meer. The facility was named for Loula Davis Lasker (1886–1961), a philanthropist and social worker, and the daughter of German immigrant Morris Davis Lasker and sister of Albert Lasker, who donated $600,000 to help build the facility. The work shrunk the Meer from 10.6 acres (4.3 ha) to 8.1 acres (3.3 ha), and the Meer was temporarily drained to facilitate construction of the project. The rink was supposed to be completed in mid-1966, but flood damage caused by poor drainage prevented the pool from opening as scheduled. Lasker Rink opened on December 22, 1966.

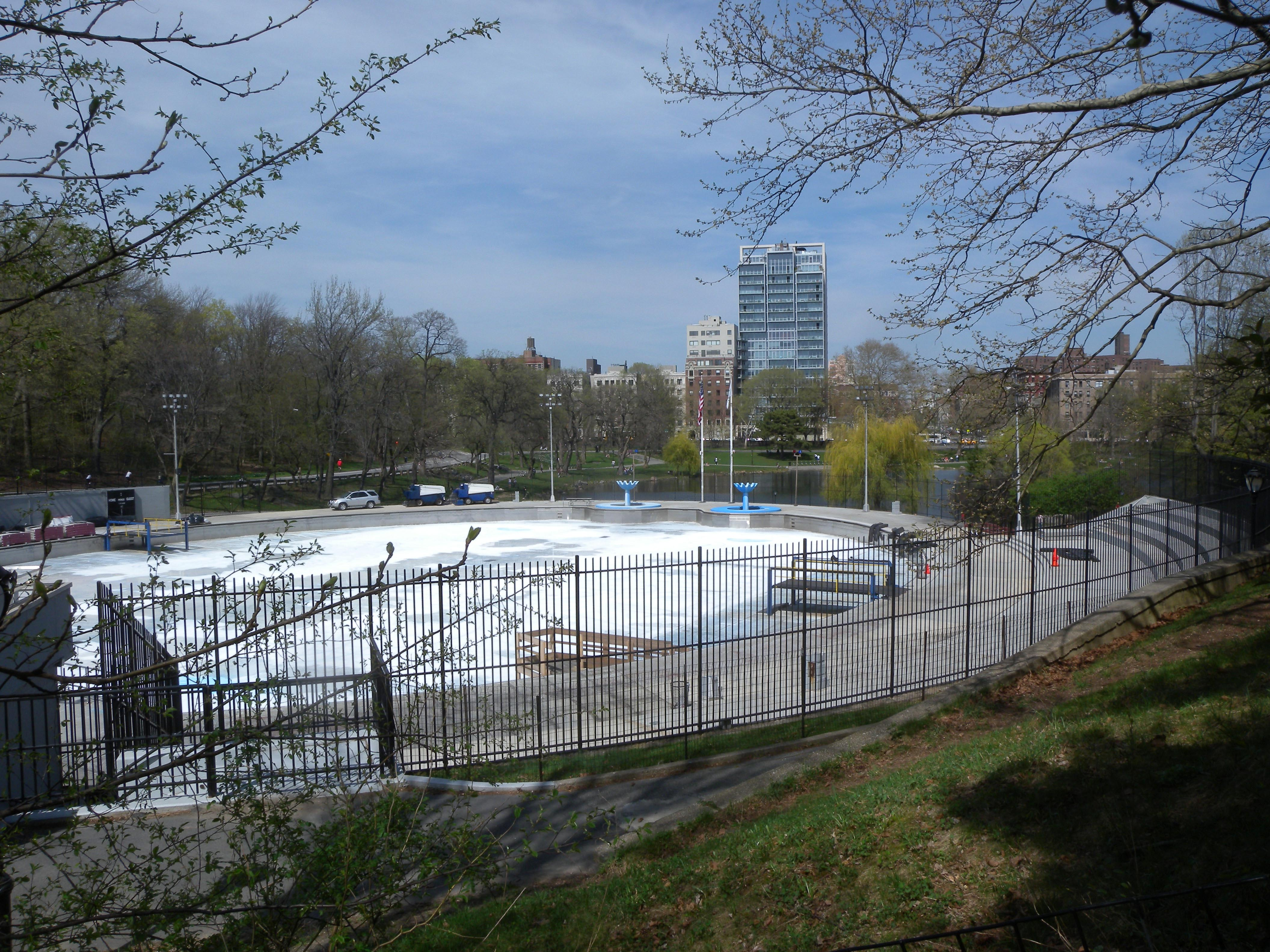
The former Lasker Rink looking down from East Drive, 2010

Lasker Rink was known to New Yorkers as being less crowded and less expensive than Wollman Rink, Central Park's other ice skating rink at the southern end of the park. Over the years, Lasker and other facilities in northern Central Park, which was surrounded by poorer neighborhoods, were generally not as well maintained as facilities in southern Central Park, which was surrounded by wealthier neighborhoods and had more tourists. Several events such as a 1969 ice-skating competition were intended to draw public attention to the facility. By the late 20th century, the rink was rundown; Yusef Salaam, who later became a New York City Council member, said that he wore sneakers around the pool because it was so common to find broken glass there. Justin Davidson, the architecture critic for Curbed, described Lasker Rink as resembling "the back of a suburban supermarket".

=== Trump and M&T concessions ===
In 1986, real estate developer Donald Trump made an offer to New York City mayor Ed Koch to rebuild at no cost the deteriorating Wollman Rink in return for a franchise to operate the rink and an adjacent restaurant to recoup his costs. As part of the agreement to keep operating Wollman Rink, Trump agreed to also take a concession for Lasker Rink, and the Trump Organization won concessions for the rinks in 1987. The Trump Organization held the concession until 1995, when M&T Pretzel Inc. outbid Trump for a six-year contract to operate Wollman and Lasker skating rinks.

A Trump-owned subsidiary, Wollman Rink Operations LLC, won another concession in 2001 to operate the rinks until April 30, 2021. Wollman Rink Operations LLC is owned by DJT Holdings LLC which was owned by the Donald J. Trump Revocable Trust for the duration of Trump's first presidency. In 2019, the Trump Organization removed the Trump name from most signs and logos at both Wollman and Lasker Rinks without giving a reason.

On January 13, 2021, New York City mayor Bill de Blasio announced that the city government would be severing all contracts with the Trump Organization, saying Trump had been involved in the previous week's storming of the United States Capitol. The cancellation of the Trump Organization's contracts to operate Wollman Rink, Lasker Rink, and the Central Park Carousel was supposed to go into effect on February 26. The city later allowed the rinks to stay open until the scheduled end of the skating season. The Trump concession expired on April 30, 2021. Because of the rink's planned renovation (see § Replacement), NYC Parks did not select a new concessionaire at that time.

=== Replacement ===
Plans for replacing Lasker Rink date to 2015. In November 2015, a few weeks after the start of the 2015–2016 skating season, faulty drainage forced an emergency closure of the rink; at the time, the rink was planned to remain closed for the rest of the season. After repairs to the rink progressed at a faster rate than originally expected, it reopened two weeks after the initial closure. A $150 million project to replace Lasker Rink with a new facility was officially announced in 2018. Initial plans called for the project to be completed by 2023. At the time, the rink was prone to flooding, and it stood empty for several months a year, when it could not be used as either a pool or a rink due to cool weather. In addition, the rink's paint had begun to peel.

The Central Park Conservancy hosted public hearings on the plans. Neighborhood residents expressed concern about the possibility of the rink closing and the fact that the conservancy was more involved in projects near wealthier neighborhoods at the southern end of the park. Updated plans were published in 2019, in which the rink would be closed between late 2021 and 2024. Some $150 million was to be budgeted to the project, but the renovation itself would cost $110 million, while proposed new programming would cost $40 million, The city had budgeted $50 million and the Central Park Conservancy was raising the remainder. As part of the plan, the Loch running underneath Lasker Rink would be restored to a more natural state, necessitating the demolition of the existing rink's bulky structure and surrounding paths. The new center would be built on the shore of the Harlem Meer lake. This would reconnect the Loch with the North Woods.

Demolition and reconstruction was scheduled to begin in early 2021, and a groundbreaking ceremony for the project began in September 2021. As part of the project, a temporary dam was constructed around the Meer, allowing workers to develop the pool and rink behind the dam. By late 2024, the cost of the new Lasker Rink's reconstruction had risen to $160 million; the Central Park Conservancy provided $100 million of this funding, while the city government provided the remaining balance. At the time, the rink and pool were planned to open in 2025. The rink was planned to be renamed for several donors who had provided funds for the rink's reconstruction. That November, it was announced that the new recreation center would be known as Davis Center at the Harlem Meer. The Central Park Conservancy announced in March 2025 that the new recreation center would open on April 26, and Davis Center opened as scheduled on that date. In contrast to Lasker Rink, which had been leased out to private operators, Davis Center was managed directly by the Central Park Conservancy. The Gottesman Pool opened within Davis Center in June 2025.

== Use ==
=== Davis Center ===
Davis Center is located on the shore of Harlem Meer in the northern part of Central Park, east of the site of the previous rink. Christopher Nolan was the landscape architect, John Doherty was the executive architect, and Susan T. Rodriguez was the design architect for the project. Like the old Lasker Rink, Davis Center presents programs throughout the year. A boardwalk is located alongside the southern edge of Harlem Meer. The center also includes a 34,000-square-foot (3,200 m^{2}) building, whose design was based on the landscape of the ravine surrounding the Harlem Meer.

The facility is set within a slope, containing a new pool at a lower elevation than the previous pool. The pool, known as the Gottesman Pool, is an oval measuring 120 by 285 feet (37 by 87 m) across, accessed by a large set of glass doors. During the winter, the pool is converted into a rink, while during the spring and fall, it can be used as a lawn.

The structure itself was designed to Leadership in Energy and Environmental Design (LEED) Gold standards, reusing materials from the old rink. The facade is made of Adirondack Mountains stone, Inside Davis Center is a great hall, with the glass entrance doors on one side and a natural-looking wall (an extension of the facade) on the other side. The interior includes bathrooms, lockers, and machinery that treats water from the pool, and the ceiling is made of Douglas fir beams. The building's green roof has a skylight, as well as a walkway that is linked with the boardwalk. A writer for The Wall Street Journal wrote that the new design "regards the park as a work of landscape art, whose natural topography should dictate its architecture", while Justin Davidson said the center "feels open and airy".

=== Lasker Rink ===
The Lasker facility was used as a swimming pool in the summer and a skating/hockey rink during the winter. Lasker Rink was open from late October through March for public skating, skating schools, and ice hockey. Over the years the ice surface had different configurations, but most recently was outfitted with two rinks, which were 195-feet by 65-feet, which is slightly smaller than the standard 200-feet by 85-feet National Hockey League hockey rinks. The rinks used artificial refrigeration to maintain the ice. Between 2019 and its final operating season in 2021, 87% of Lasker Pool and Rink users were New York City residents. Nearly half or 45% were from the immediately surrounding neighborhoods such as Harlem, East Harlem, and Manhattan Valley, while 26% came from other Upper Manhattan neighborhoods and the Bronx, and 16% came from elsewhere in the city,

==== Programming ====
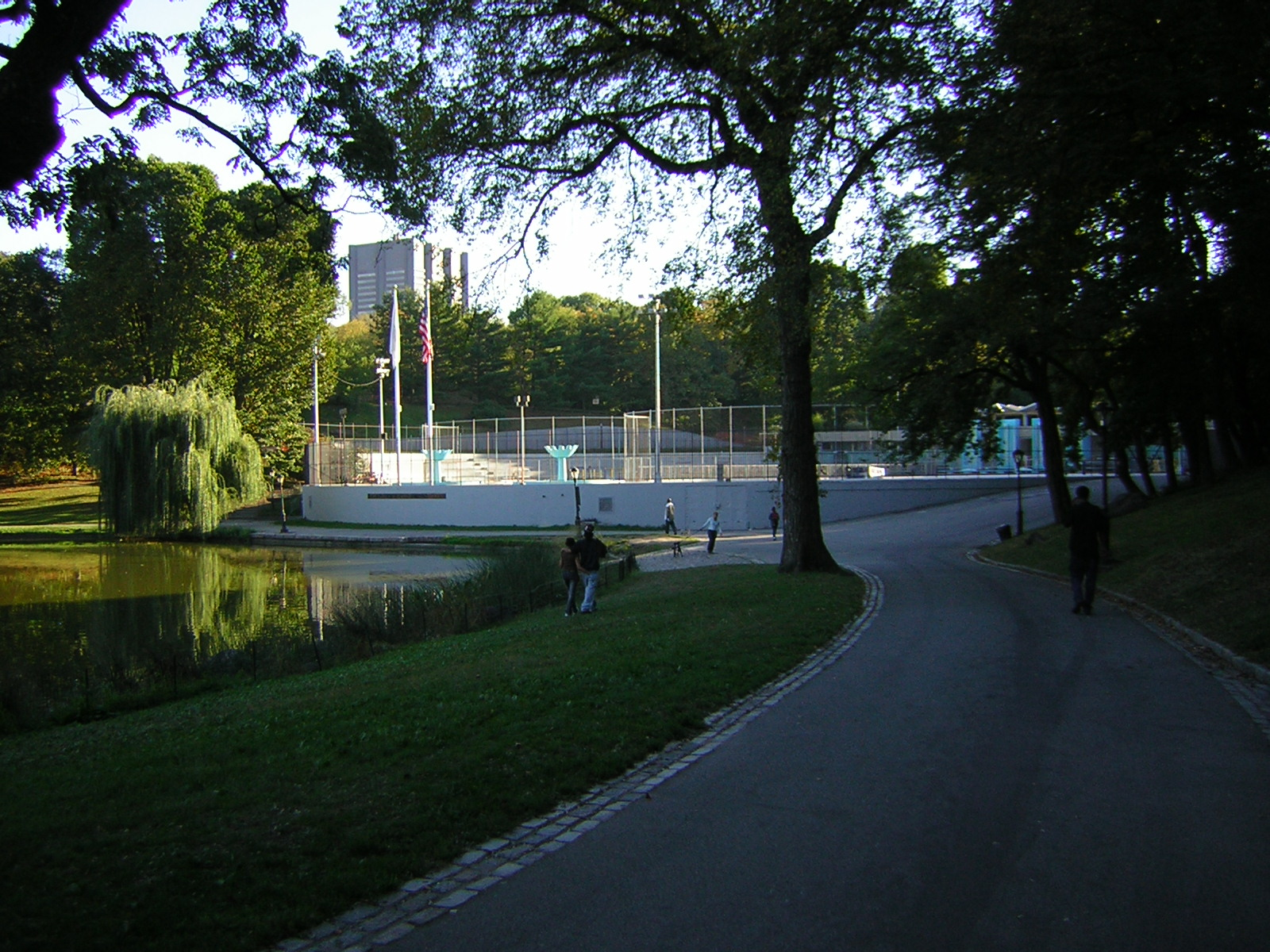
Looking up from Harlem Meer

Lasker Rink was host to an annual charity adult hockey tournament, The Central Park Classic, taking place over Presidents Day weekend, ran by the Canadian Association of New York, which drew teams from all over the northeast, including teams from Canada. Funds raised were donated to area youth hockey programs, including Ice Hockey in Harlem. Some of the hockey programs that operated at Lasker Rink included:

- Central Park Ice Hockey used the two rinks where adult hockey leagues played 4 on 4 ice hockey. Teams were able to be coed and were separated based on skill level.
- Ice Hockey In Harlem (IHIH), a non-for-profit that combined classroom diligence with hockey. Volunteers acted as coaches.
- The Central Park North Stars, a special needs hockey team of the American Special Hockey Association used Lasker as their home rink until it closed in 2021. Since the Davis Center's opening, the team now uses the new facility for practice and home games.
- Various private schools, such as St. David's, St. Bernard's, Buckley, and Browning hosted programs at Lasker.
- The NyIcecats, founded in 1999 by Sabbath observant Jewish families, which offered hockey to kids of every age, skill level, and religious background.

==== Similar setups ====
Lasker Rink was the only convertible ice rink/pool facility in the United States for many years. McCarren Park Pool in Williamsburg, Brooklyn, had a similar set up in 2013 and 2014. A similar indoor pool/rink, the Kobe Port Island Sport center, was built in Kobe, Japan, in 1981. The Osaka Pool in Osaka, Japan, also functions in this dual fashion.
