= Pat Hickey (ice hockey) =

Canadian ice hockey player

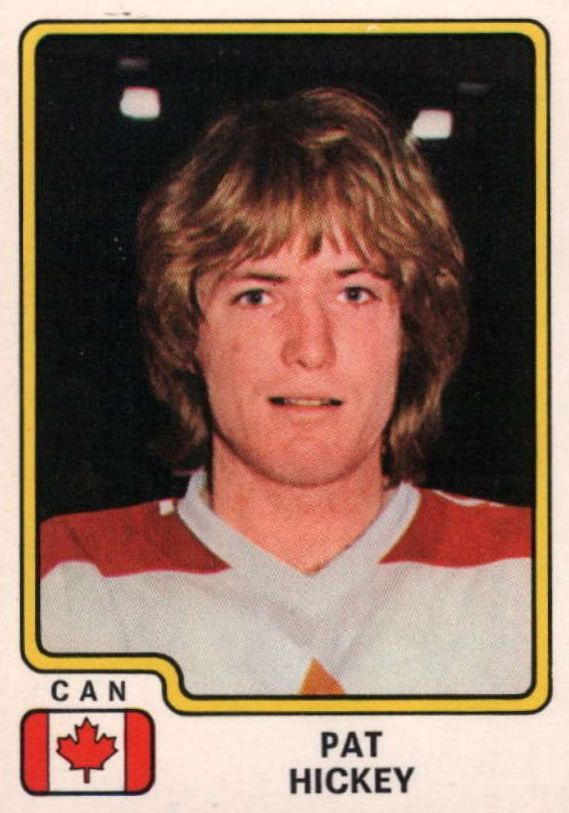
- Born: May 15, 1953 (age 73) Brantford, Ontario, Canada
- Height: 6 ft 1 in (185 cm)
- Weight: 190 lb (86 kg; 13 st 8 lb)
- Position: Left wing
- Shot: Left
- Played for: Toronto Toros; New York Rangers; Colorado Rockies; Toronto Maple Leafs; Quebec Nordiques; St. Louis Blues
- National team: Canada
- NHL draft: 30th overall, 1973; New York Rangers
- WHA draft: 18th overall, 1973; Toronto Toros
- Playing career: 1973–1985
Medal record
Representing Canada
Ice hockey
World Championships
Bronze medal – third place	1978 Prague

Patrick Joseph Hickey (born May 15, 1953) is a Canadian former professional ice hockey left winger who played 2 seasons in the World Hockey Association with the Toronto Toros and then 10 seasons in the National Hockey League (NHL) for the New York Rangers, Toronto Maple Leafs, Quebec Nordiques and St. Louis Blues between 1973 and 1985. Pat is the brother of Greg Hickey.

== Playing career ==
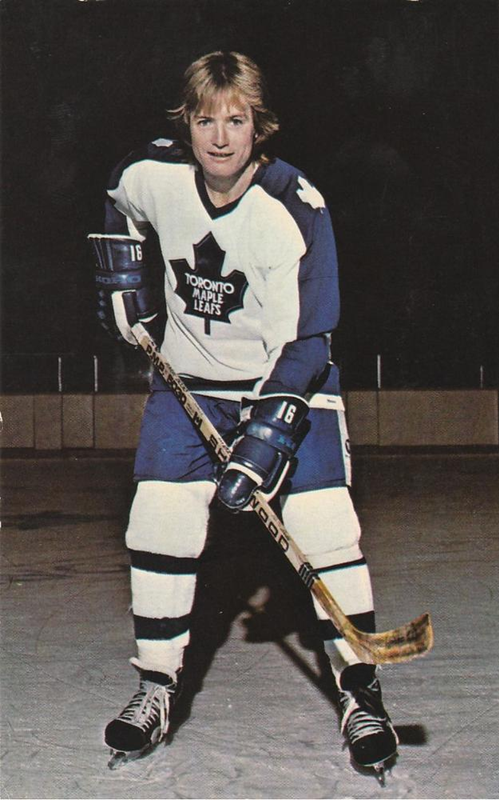
1979 postcard of Hickey for Toronto Maple Leafs

Born in Brantford, Ontario, Hickey was drafted 30th overall by the New York Rangers in the 1973 NHL Amateur Draft. Nicknamed "Hitch", Hickey was additionally drafted 18th overall in the 1973 WHA Amateur Draft by the Toronto Toros, for whom he played his first two professional seasons in the World Hockey Association (WHA). Joining the Rangers for the 1975–76 NHL season, Hickey went on to play 646 career NHL games, scoring 192 goals and 212 assists for 404 points. A popular player during his time with the Rangers, Hickey played on a line with Swedish stars Anders Hedberg and Ulf Nilsson, in part because of his speed and scoring ability.

Hickey was later part of a high scoring line in Toronto, along with Rick Vaive and Bill Derlago.

== Post-hockey career ==
Hickey began his financial service career as an account executive with the New York City investment banking firm of Drexel Burnham Lambert upon retirement from the National Hockey League in 1985. In 1988, he was appointed general manager of the New Haven Nighthawks, the Los Angeles Kings' American Hockey League (AHL) affiliate, and was subsequently awarded "Executive of the Year" honours in 1992, for his management of an independent franchise and initiation/completion of the AHL expansion plan. For six years, Hickey was active at the ownership level as well as serving the AHL on finance, marketing and NHL liaison & development committees as a league governor.

Hickey has been extensively involved in developing youth outreach programs. He was an early volunteer supporting Dave Wilk who co-founded Ice Hockey in Harlem, an after school program that blends academics and sport. Hickey has played a critical role in developing relationships between the financial services community and the NYR Seeing Kids Achieve, Triumph and Excel (S.K.A.T.E.) Foundation, (now Garden of Dreams Foundation), the Brantwood Foundation, and Ice Hockey in Harlem. Hickey has served on the board of directors of Ice Theatre (of New York) International, Hillfield Strathallan College and is a board member of the New York Rangers Alumni Association, as well as liaison to the NHL Alumni Board of Directors.

Hickey is an investment advisor and registered institutional representative with RBC Dominion Securities and has been based in Hamilton, Ontario for 17 years. Hickey has been a member of the executive council and designated "Miracle Maker" annually with Children's Charities since 1997.

== Legacy ==
In the 2009 book 100 Ranger Greats, the authors ranked Hickey at No. 78 all-time of the 901 New York Rangers who had played during the team's first 82 seasons.

== Career statistics ==
=== Regular season and playoffs ===
			Regular season					Playoffs
Season	Team	League	GP	G	A	Pts	PIM	GP	G	A	Pts	PIM
1970–71	Hamilton Red Wings	OHA	55	15	17	32	46	—	—	—	—	—
1971–72	Hamilton Red Wings	OHA	58	21	39	60	78	—	—	—	—	—
1972–73	Hamilton Red Wings	OHA	61	32	47	79	80	—	—	—	—	—
1973–74	Toronto Toros	WHA	78	26	29	55	52	12	3	3	6	12
1974–75	Toronto Toros	WHA	74	35	34	69	50	5	0	1	1	4
1975–76	New York Rangers	NHL	70	14	22	36	36	—	—	—	—	—
1976–77	New York Rangers	NHL	80	23	17	40	35	—	—	—	—	—
1977–78	New York Rangers	NHL	80	40	33	73	47	3	2	0	2	0
1978–79	New York Rangers	NHL	80	34	41	75	56	18	1	7	8	6
1979–80	New York Rangers	NHL	7	2	2	4	10	—	—	—	—	—
1979–80	Colorado Rockies	NHL	24	7	9	16	10	—	—	—	—	—
1979–80	Toronto Maple Leafs	NHL	45	22	16	38	16	3	0	0	0	2
1980–81	Toronto Maple Leafs	NHL	72	16	33	49	49	—	—	—	—	—
1981–82	Toronto Maple Leafs	NHL	1	0	0	0	0	—	—	—	—	—
1981–82	New York Rangers	NHL	53	15	14	29	32	—	—	—	—	—
1981–82	Quebec Nordiques	NHL	7	0	1	1	4	15	1	3	4	21
1982–83	Salt Lake Golden Eagles	CHL	36	13	12	25	28	6	1	0	1	2
1982–83	St. Louis Blues	NHL	1	0	0	0	0	—	—	—	—	—
1983–84	St. Louis Blues	NHL	67	9	11	20	24	11	1	1	2	6
1984–85	St. Louis Blues	NHL	57	10	13	23	32	3	0	0	0	2
WHA totals			152	61	63	124	102	17	3	4	7	16
NHL totals			644	192	212	404	351	55	5	11	16	37

=== International ===
Year	Team	Event	GP	G	A	Pts	PIM
1978	Canada	WC	10	5	1	6	4
