= Ice Hockey in Harlem =

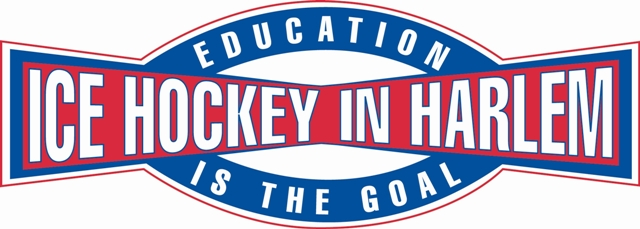
- Founded: 1987
- Location: New York City, New York, United States

Ice Hockey in Harlem (IHIH) is a nonprofit organization based in New York City, New York, that works to improve the social and academic well-being of children from the Harlem community. Through active participation in ice hockey, IHIH student-athletes learn the fundamentals of the game, engage in an active lifestyle, and broaden their life experiences.

Since 1987, thousands of boys and girls have taken part in the program and have grown into capable, responsible adults who continue to live, work and, in many cases, raise their own children in Harlem. Each season, Ice Hockey in Harlem looks to offer new athletic and educational opportunities for children in its community. IHIH uses the sport of hockey to engage students and improve their self-esteem, while also providing a safe after school alternative that keeps them from harm and improves their school attendance and grades.

Ice Hockey in Harlem is also a member program of the National Hockey League's Hockey Is For Everyone initiative and has enjoyed a long relationship with New York Rangers, dating back to its inception.

== History and growth ==
Ice Hockey in Harlem began in the winter of 1987 with forty eager participants ranging in age from 9–12 years old. All participants agreed to attend weekly classroom sessions and skate one night a week. In class these Ice Hockey in Harlem pioneers were taught math, reading, and geography using hockey cities and statistics as teaching tools.

With a cursory knowledge of the basics, the youngsters donned mismatched, second-hand equipment and wobbled onto the ice of Lasker Rink, an outdoor facility at the northern end of Central Park. Under the tutelage of Co- Founders Dave Wilk and Todd Levy, and with the help of former New York Ranger Pat Hickey, the boys were soon skating, shooting, and passing as though they had been playing the game for years. After that rookie season, the program managed to raise enough money to send one player to a summer hockey camp in California.

By Year Five, Ice Hockey in Harlem had expanded to 125 kids. With this increase in enrollment, IHIH was on the ice at Lasker Rink three nights a week for clinics, a six-team intramural league, and an All-Star touring team. The New York Rangers were generously supporting the program with a mid-season clinic at Lasker and fund-raising efforts. That summer players went off to summer hockey camp, in Canada and the U.S. Two players graduated from the program to attend prep schools on IHIH scholarships.

Before the start of Year Seven, the Ice Hockey in Harlem Board of Directors decided that expansion of the program and the increase in participants exceeded the capabilities of an all-volunteer staff. The full-time staff includes a Hockey Director and an Events Manager.

== Today ==
Now in its third decade, Ice Hockey in Harlem has become well known throughout the hockey community. It has also served as the model for numerous programs throughout the country. For the past two decades, Ice Hockey in Harlem has helped children learn to play hockey regardless of their economic background. More importantly, through its educational and community service components, IHIH has given its participants the tools to succeed in their schools and as solid citizens in their communities.

=== Hockey programs ===
On-Ice Programming takes place three nights per week and Saturdays at Lasker Rink in Northern Central Park. Students normally spend a minimum of one and a half hours on ice each week. The hockey program is broken out into an introductory hockey program for beginners and advanced sessions by age groups as approved by USA Hockey.

The Learn to Skate/Learn to Play program is for children between the ages of 4 and 12 who are getting started. They are provided with hockey equipment and ice skates and begin the process of getting comfortable on the ice and learning the rules of the game. This is where they begin to build confidence and an appreciation for the game and their coaches.

Age specific on ice activities are for students from 4–18 years old include skills development sessions and game setting scrimmages. Eventually students take part in intramural scrimmages to begin gaining in-game experience and then home and travel exhibition games against teams from the local New York City and Westchester community, New Jersey and Connecticut.

=== Educational programs ===
These programs focus on academic achievement and character development for students between the ages of 9 and 13. Through educational programming, participants are given the opportunity to develop their academic skills, and by doing so, demonstrate Ice Hockey in Harlem's motto: “Education is our Goal.” Students are required to attend weekly classroom sessions as a condition for participation in the hockey program.

The IHIH after school curriculum teaches geography, history, and social studies, and skills in math, reading, and writing, using hockey as the central reference for study. This includes hockey literature, cities, statistics, players, rules of play, etc. IHIH has made literacy a focus of its educational programming.

Four years ago, 'Book Club' was created for participants ages 9–16 to enhance their reading skills and promote a love of reading. This year, students read “The Game of their Lives” by Peter Gwozski about the 1980-81 Edmonton Oilers.

== Benefit On The Green ==
For over 20 years, Ice Hockey in Harlem has hosted their annual Benefit on the Green Golf Tournament. This annual BOTG golf, and now, tennis outing brings together past and present NHL stars along with corporate and private sponsors for a day that includes 18 rounds of golf, a tennis tournament, a cocktail reception, awards dinner, and live sports auction. Over the years, they have had such NHL players as Mark Messier, Mike Richter, Brad Richards, Brian Leetch, Willie O’Ree, Rod Gilbert, Martin St. Louis, Stephane Matteau, Jeff Beukeboom, and Manny Malhotra, among others. Through the BOTG, Ice Hockey in Harlem has raised funding for programs to help ensure every student has a meaningful experience on and off the ice. Celebrating its 25th anniversary, Ice Hockey in Harlem will be hosting this year's BOTG at the Quaker Ridge Golf Club in Scarsdale, NY.

=== Winter Sports Celebration ===
Each year, Ice Hockey in Harlem and the New York Rangers team up to co-host the Winter Sports Auction. IHIH's Winter Sports Auction brings together kids from the program, friends, and members of the New York Rangers and Rangers alumni for an evening of fun and auction shopping in support of the kids. The event normally consists of a live sport memorabilia auction, silent auction, and raffle while allowing fans to mingle and collect autographs from current and former New York Rangers.
