= Jerry Grafstein =

Canadian politician

The Honourable Jerry S. Grafstein QC
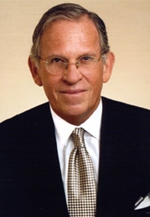

Canadian Senator from Ontario
- In office January 13, 1984 – January 2, 2010
- Nominated by: Pierre Elliott Trudeau
- Appointed by: Edward Schreyer

Personal details
- Born: Jerahmiel Samson Grafstein; 2 January 1935 (age 91) London, Ontario, Canada
- Party: Liberal
- Spouse: Carole Sniderman
- Children: 2
- Education: University of Western Ontario; University of Toronto Law School
- Occupation: Lawyer; politician; philanthropist

Jerahmiel Samson "Jerry" Grafstein (born January 2, 1935) is a Canadian lawyer, businessman, and retired politician who served as a Canadian senator from Ontario from 1984 to 2010. Grafstein was the longest-serving member of the Standing Senate Committee on Foreign Affairs and International Trade. He served as co-chair of the Canada-United States Inter-Parliamentary Group and as a senior officer of the Organization for Security and Co-Operation in Europe (OSCE) Parliamentary Assembly for over a decade. He is a former partner of Minden Gross LLP, a business law firm in Toronto, Ontario.

Grafstein is also known as one of the founders of CityTV, MTV-Multilingual (now Omni TV), YTV, and a series of other media companies in Canada, the United States, South America, and Europe. He served on the board of several enterprises, including Petro-Canada.

He co-founded a series of online newspapers, including The Wellington Street Post (Ottawa), The Penn Ave Post (Washington, DC), Israel News Cloud, HollyPost (Hollywood, California), China News Cloud, Africa News Cloud, Brazil News Cloud, India News Cloud, Russia News Cloud, Fashion News Cloud, and Animation News.

Grafstein is well known for his participation in the community and his key role in the organization of events such as "Canada Loves New York" in the aftermath of September 11, "Toronto Rocks" Concert during the SARS outbreak, and the "Canada for Asia" telethon for relief aid of tsunami victims. He has served on numerous boards and committees in support of the Canadian Jewish community. He holds numerous awards, including honorary chief of the New York City Fire Department and honorary commandant of the US Marine Corps by the Canada-United States Inter-Parliamentary Group. He was named one of Canada's 100 most important "public intellectuals" in 2005 by the National Post.

== Early life ==
Grafstein was born Jerahmiel Samson Grafstein in London, Ontario, on January 2, 1935, the son of Solomon S. Grafstein and Helen Rose Grafstein (née Bleeman). His late sister was Pauline Wayne. His father came to Canada in 1927 after he had served in the Polish Army during the First World War and then the Polish-Soviet War (1919-1921). He married in 1930 in Toronto and settled in London that year.

Grafstein was raised in London and attended public primary and high schools. He was active in sports, school governance, and acting and served as an officer in the Army Cadets. He completed his undergraduate studies at the University of Western Ontario in 1955, where was active in debates and acted in local theatre and musicals; and graduated from the University of Toronto Law School in 1958. While at law school, he was active in intramural sports at Hart House, debates, and class governance and received the highest standing in international law.

== Legal career ==
Grafstein was admitted to the Bar of Ontario in 1960. He was a member of the Bar of North West Territories for almost a decade in the 1970s and early 1980s. He lectured in commercial law and later instructed in the Bar Admissions Course at Osgoode Hall Law School. He has given lectures to law students on the role of lawyers in civil society. In 1960, Grafstein joined Minden Gross LLP, a business law firm in Toronto, and is a former partner of the firm. Following his retirement from the Senate in 2010, Grafstein has served as counsel to Minden Gross LLP.

He was appointed Queen's Counsel by the province of Ontario in 1972; and has served as chairman of the media and communications law subsection of the Canadian and Ontario Bar Associations.

== Political career ==
=== Liberal Party of Canada and Canadian government ===
Starting in 1961, Grafstein held offices of the Liberal Party of Canada from the riding level to national campaigns. He was active in federal, provincial, and municipal elections for over four decades. He took a leading role in mayoralty elections in Toronto since 1960. In 1966, he founded and edited the Journal of Liberal Thought. During 1966-1968 he served in Ottawa as executive assistant to John Turner, then Registrar General of Canada, and later as special advisor to the Department of Consumer and Corporate Affairs during its founding period.

From 1974 to 1986, he co-founded and was president of Red Leaf Communications Company, the advertising consortium for the Liberal Party during national elections. He also served as advisor to the Ministry of Transport and the Canadian International Development Agency of the Department of External Affairs and as a member of the Department of Justice Advisory Committee.

=== Senate of Canada ===
In January 1984, Prime Minister Pierre Trudeau appointed Grafstein to the Senate of Canada. He was elected vice-chair of the Toronto Liberal Caucus and served for over two decades.

Grafstein was the longest serving member of the Standing Senate Committee on Foreign Affairs and International Trade, served on the Senate Standing Committee on Agriculture and Forestry, and served from time to time on all Senate committees, including Legal and Constitutional Affairs. He served in the Special Senate/Commons Committee in its review of Canada's foreign policy. He was a chairman of the Standing Senate Committee on Banking, Trade and Commerce. During his chairmanship, the committee completed twenty reports. He also initiated the Standing Senate Committee on Banking, Trade and Commerce special studies on hedge funds and Canada's interprovincial trade barriers. He was a member of the Special Joint Senate and Commons Committee on a Review of Canada's Foreign Policy.

He has long advocated national standards for clean drinking water and introduced numerous private member's bills on mapping and safeguarding Canada's fresh water resources.

Grafstein was the longest serving co-chair of the Canada-United States Inter-Parliamentary Group (the largest inter-parliamentary group in Canada) for 15 years. In that capacity, he advocated Canadian issues to senators, congressmen, state legislators, governors, and Canada-United States border alliances in states and cities across America. Grafstein introduced numerous resolutions and a private member's bill to establish a national portrait gallery in Ottawa, co-sponsored a private member's bill in the Senate establishing Holocaust Memorial Day in Canada in 1998, and introduced a private member's bill that established the Parliamentary Poet Laureate in 2001. He also introduced a private member's bill (Bill 215) to amend the Criminal Code for the explicit inclusion of "suicide bombing" as a definition of terrorism, which became part of the Canadian Criminal Code in 2011.

In 1988, he co-chaired the Preparatory Committee for the G7 Economic Summit held in Toronto.

On retirement from the Senate in 2010, he received from Parliament the Canadian flag that flew over Parliament (the "Two Week Flag") and from Congress, the American flag that flew over the US Capitol in Washington (the "One Day Flag") in recognition of his political activities in Canada and the United States, respectively.

=== International affairs ===
In July 2007, Grafstein was elected vice president of the Organization for Security and Co-Operation in Europe (OSCE) Parliamentary Assembly, the world's largest parliamentary organization dedicated to human rights, democratic rights, economic security and co-operation (after he had served as its treasurer for six years), and served as president of the Liberal, Democratic Reform Group there for a decade. He served as vice chair and chair of the Standing Committee on Economic Affairs, Science, Technology and the Environment. He served on the OSCE election monitoring missions throughout Eastern Europe and, more recently, in Georgia, Ukraine and Montenegro, and on resolving "frozen foreign conflicts." He co-sponsored numerous resolutions condemning racism and antisemitism at the OSCE PA and in the Parliament of Canada.

Grafstein co-chaired Middle East Economic Partnership forums held throughout Europe and across the Mediterranean. In September 2008 he co-hosted the first OSCEPA meeting held in Toronto. Highlights included the Georgian Crisis and a Mediterranean Forum, which he co-chaired.

He served on many Parliamentary Friendship Groups in Europe (east and west), Asia, North Africa and South America. In the fall of 2007, he was elected vice president of the Canada-Pakistan Parliamentary Friendship Group. In 2009, he was elected vice chairman of the Canadian Armenian Parliamentary Friendship Group. He served as a member of the International Political Committee for Co-existence between Muslims and Jews. In April 2009, Grafstein helped organize a counter-conference in New York City in the follow-up UN Human Rights Conference on Durban, held in Geneva, to combat antisemitism and lectured on the topic across Europe, Canada, and the United States. He co-sponsored numerous successful resolutions at the OSCE PA meetings across Western and Eastern Europe against racism and antisemitism. In May 2009, while he was a senator, he helped organize and was a keynote speaker at the OSCE PA Economic Conference in Dublin, Ireland.

Grafstein served as a member of Canada/Germany Atlantik-Brücke for over a decade. He was the first vice-president of the International Council of Jewish Parliamentarians.

== Business career ==
Grafstein had wide-ranging legal and business experience in all aspects of media, including television, cable, radio, telephony, telecommunications microwave, high speed wireless data transmission, advertising, production, distribution, publishing, and financing.

In 1954, he purchased Toronto radio station CHUM-AM with Allan Waters, later selling his share to Waters. In 1972, he co-founded CITY-TV.

From 1979 to 1984, he served on the board of Petro-Canada, was a member of the Northwest Territorial Bar, and served as counsel to Northwest Territorial Airways for almost a decade. He then traveled across the far north extensively.

He was a co-founder of a range of media companies, especially broadcasting, communications, and publishing enterprises, including CUC Broadcasting Limited; national specialty TV channels in lifestyle, youth (YTV) and music; CityTV (Canada's first independent UHF station); MTV-Multilingual Television (Toronto) (now OMNI TV); CUC Cablevision (UK) Limited (Telecential); and Northern Communications, Ontario. He co-founded one of the longest private microwave companies in Canada that ran from Windsor to Toronto to mid-Northern Ontario, Canbras Communications Corporation; and Multivision Communications Corp. (Bolivia's largest MMDS Hyper Cable and cable MSO). He served on the board of Ukraine Enterprise Corporation, which made early investments in Ukraine.

He was also a lead director of Toronto Life Publishing Company Limited, which published Toronto Life (after it merged with Toronto Calendar) and Toronto Life Fashion, two of Canada's leading lifestyle and fashion magazines, and co-founded Toronto Life Fashion File, which is now seen on television around the world.

In addition, he served as a governor of the Canadian Opera Company and, for over a decade, was the chairman and a board member of the O'Keefe Centre, Canada's largest public performing arts centre. He served on the board of the Shaw Festival, the planning committee of the Stratford Festival, and the Festival of Festivals. He served as chairman of the City of Toronto Asia/Pacific Committee and vice-chairman of the Toronto-Chongqing Association and Toronto-Frankfurt Friendship Association.

Grafstein's books include A Leader Must Be a Leader: Encounters with Eleven Prime Ministers (2019) and The Fractured Twentieth Century (2022).

== Community ==
Grafstein served on the Board of the League for Human Rights of B'nai B'rith and the Joint Community Relations Committee of Toronto in the 1960s and 1970s. He served as co-chairman of Toronto Committee for the Group of Seven Economic Summit in Toronto in 1988. He served as a member of the executive for the Toronto 1996 and 2008 Olympic Bid Committees.

In 1998, the Grafstein Annual Lecture in Communications was established by Grafstein to commemorate the 40th anniversary of his graduation from the University of Toronto Faculty of Law and the 10th anniversary of the graduation of his son, Laurence Grafstein, and daughter-in-law, Rebecca Grafstein (née Weatherhead), both from the Class of 1988. The Grafstein Lecture is hosted by the Centre for Innovation Law and Policy at the Faculty of Law. He and his wife, Carole, established the Grafstein Chair in Jewish Philosophy at the University of Toronto the following year.

Grafstein co-organized "Canada Loves New York" in November 2001, when over 26,000 Canadians visited New York City after September 11, to assist New York City's recovery, which was called "the largest peaceful invasion of Canadians since the War of 1812." In the same year, Grafstein was given the War Chief's tomahawk of the Northern Peigan Tribe (Blackfoot Confederacy) of Alberta for advancing the cause of clean drinking water on First Nations' Reserves across Canada. On April 4, 2003, Grafstein co-organized, with Friends of America, a pro-Ametican rally at Nathan Phillips Square in Toronto with over 1,000 participants. In July 2003, he co-created and co-organized "Toronto Rocks" to offset the negative impact on Toronto in the global media as a result of the SARS outbreak. Headlined by the Rolling Stones, it is considered to be the largest ticketed band concert in history and was attended by almost half-a-million people. In December 2004, Grafstein co-organized "Canada for Asia", a three-hour broadcast telethon in aid of relief for tsunami victims that raised over $15,000,000. On August 5, 2014, Grafstein led more than 500 Canadians, including five Members of Parliament and a senator, on a solidarity mission to Jerusalem.

== Awards and honours ==
In 1992, Grafstein was the recipient of the 125th Anniversary of the Confederation of Canada Medal. In December 1996, he was named the "Man of the Year" by the Chabad Lubavitch of Ontario. In 2002, Grafstein was the recipient of the Queen Elizabeth II Golden Jubilee Medal. In 2003, Grafstein was honoured by the Canadian Society of New York for his dedication to strengthening ties between Canada and the United States. As a senator, he was made an honorary chief of the New York City Fire Department and an honorary commandant of the US Marine Corps by the Canada-United States Inter-Parliamentary Group.

On November 4, 2005, he was named one of Canada's 100 most important "Public Intellectuals" by the National Post in its series "Beautiful Minds." On November 12, 2005 he was made a Duke of Friulani, Italy (Ducato dei Vini Friulani). In November 2010, the Canadian Friends of the Hebrew University (CFHU) created The Honourable Jerry and Carole Grafstein Network for Cancer Research at the Institute For Medical Research, Israel-Canada (IMRIC). In 2011, the CFHU named him "Man of the Year" in Toronto. On November 27, 2011, he was installed as honorary chairman of the Board of Governors of the Canadian Yeshiva & Rabbinical School, University of Toronto, at its inaugural convocation, the first such rabbinical school of its kind in Canada. Grafstein is the president and chairman of the National Board for the Canadian Friends of the Tel Aviv University and a governor of the university.

On July 7, 2014, Grafstein was honoured by Chief Ron Cooper of the Mohawk Nation and presented with a handcrafted lacrosse stick.

== Author ==
Grafstein has written numerous articles and delivered papers on broadcasting regulations; communications; computers; travel; international relations; technology; transportation, politics; international trade; and constitutional matters in Canada, the United States, and Europe.

He has written articles on key aspects of the public life of Winston Churchill.

His first book, Beyond Imagination, is an anthology of some of Canada's outstanding authors and poets that he edited; it published by McClelland & Stewart Inc. in 1995. His second book, The Making of the Parliamentary Poet Laureate : Based on a Private Member's Bill , was published by the Porcupine's Quill. He co-authored his third book, The Passage Through Parliament to Establish Holocaust Memorial Day, in Canada in 2004. His fourth book, Suicide Bombings: Parliament Speaks, was published in 2012 and is the parliamentary history of Bill 215, an Act to amend the Criminal Code (Suicide Bombing).

== Personal life ==
Grafstein is married to Carole (née Sniderman), a community activist, a volunteer leader, a leading fundraiser for cancer research across Canada, and a member of the Order of Canada. They have two sons, Larry and Michael.

== See also ==
- List of Ontario senators
