= Harlem Meer =

Man-made lake in Central Park, New York City

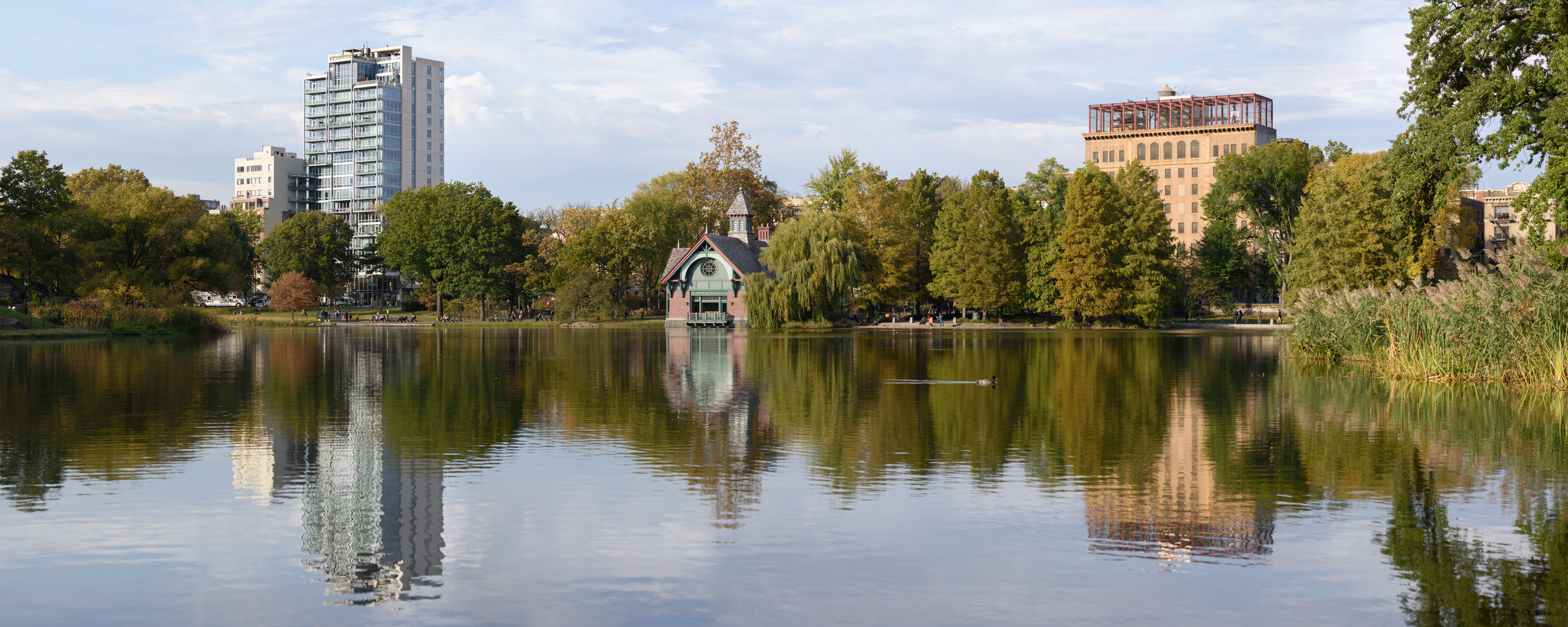
- The Dana Discovery Center seen across Harlem Meer.

- Location within Manhattan Location within New York City Location within New York
- Location: Central Park, Manhattan, New York City, New York, U.S.
- Coordinates: 40°47′47.8″N 73°57′6″W
- Type: lake

Harlem Meer is a man-made lake at the northeast corner of New York City's Central Park. It lies west of Fifth Avenue, south of 110th Street, and north of the Conservatory Garden, near the Harlem and East Harlem neighborhoods of Manhattan. The lake, as originally constructed, was 12.634 acres (51,130 m^{2}), but after the completion in 1966 of the Lasker skating rink and swimming pool, it was reduced to approximately 11 acres (45,000 m^{2}) in area and approximately 0.75 miles (1.21 km) in circumference.

Notable buildings and structures of Central Park. Click on the map and then on the points for details.

== History ==
=== Before the creation of Central Park ===
Harlem Meer was constructed at the confluence of three streams: first, Harlem Creek flowing from the north, just west of Fifth Avenue; second, an unnamed stream flowing from the west along what would become 110th Street; and third, Montayne's Rivulet, a stream flowing down a ravine from the southwest (the only one of the three still in existence). At this confluence with its two tributaries, Harlem Creek became Harlem Marsh, a semi-brackish, partly tidal wetland, flowing in an easterly direction (between what are now 106th and 110th streets), slowly draining into the East River. (Note: Harlem Commons, as the area was known, was disputed between the City of New York and the heirs of the Harlem freeholders for most of the 18th century. It was divided into house lots and sold in 1825.)

Prior to its burial beneath the city's expanding street grid, the marsh separated the suburb of Harlem to the north from the southern part of Manhattan island. To avoid the marsh, the Boston Post Road (known in New York as the Eastern Post Road) diverged to the northwest, entering the future park (near what is now Fifth Avenue and 92nd Street), climbing up to McGowan's tavern (at the 105th Street line), then descending to the gap where once stood the blockhouse marking the site of McGowan's Pass, then descending further to the future site of the lake, where it crossed the rivulet, then exited the future park (near what is now 110th Street and Lenox Avenue) before continuing on to King's Bridge and points north.

The hills to the south and west of Harlem Meer were once the site of a series of connected military fortifications, erected during the War of 1812 in anticipation of a British invasion from the north, including (from west to east) the Blockhouse, Fort Fish, Nutter's Battery, a second blockhouse at McGowan's Pass, and Fort Clinton.

=== Derivation of the name ===
Harlem Meer (also called "Harlem Lake" in its early days) took the first part of its name from the adjacent neighborhood of Harlem, and the second from the Dutch word for "lake". For example, Haarlemmermeer, the name of a municipality in the Netherlands, translates to English as "Haarlem's Lake".

=== Creation of the Meer ===
Harlem Meer was built within the "Extension," the 65 acre section of Central Park from 106th to 110th streets that was formally added in 1863 to the park's original 778 acres. Thus, the lake's creation required that the park commissioners approve amendments to the original park plan.

Most of the work was carried out by park comptroller Andrew Haswell Green and his superintending engineer William H. Grant, after Frederick Law Olmsted and Calvert Vaux, the park's principal designers, resigned (Olmsted in the summer of 1861; Vaux in 1863), and before they were rehired in mid-1865. In his report of January 1, 1866, Grant wrote:

During the last two years the portion of the Park north of 102d street, and including what is known as the "Extension," has chiefly engaged [our] attention, being the district that was last entered upon in the general work of improvement. This is now mainly completed.

Having been entrusted with the exercise of a liberal discretion in the execution of this part of the work, since the retirement of Mr. F.L. Olmsted from its general direction, I trust the work is not inharmonious with the work at large.

In the course of the transformation of Montayne's Rivulet from 1862 to 1866, the part of the stream that stood outside the park was diverted into the sewer system and buried beneath land development, whereas the part inside the park was connected (as was the rest of the park) to the Croton Aqueduct water distribution system. Some of the water for the new stream came from the drainage system of the North Meadow, but most came from the overflow of the newly completed Upper Reservoir (now the Central Park Reservoir) which was diverted from the reservoir's north gatehouse via a 48" underground conduit to a small grotto at the western park boundary near 102nd street, and made to look like a natural spring. The reconstructed stream was embellished with several new features:

- The Pool, a small body of water at the west side of the park (excavated in 1862 and watered in the summer of 1863).
- Cascade, "a twelve-foot drop of boulder-steps."
- Glen Span Arch, a 63 foot long bridge spanning the stream just east of the Pool (completed in 1865).
- The Loch, a small body of water east of the Pool (completed and watered in December 1865). Over time, the Loch has disappeared; nowadays, park administrators apply the name to the entire length of the stream connecting the Pool to the Harlem Meer, a misnomer, but easier to pronounce than the stream's previous, Francophonic name.
- Huddlestone Arch, a bridge "of a massive rustic description" built at a curve of the park's East Drive, spanning the stream at the bottom of the ravine (completed in 1865).
- Harlem Meer (completed in 1866).

Creation of the new lake required not only the excavation of 109,500 cubic yards of "earth, sand, and gravel," but also the introduction of 98,600 cubic yards of fill to raise the shore level to the newly established grades of Fifth Avenue and 110th Street, and to level the eastern portion of the lake bed. Engineer Grant formed the lake bed with a 12" thick clay liner protected by a 6" layer of sand. At the lake's outlet, Grant installed a weir to regulate the water level: 5 feet deep in summer to discourage weeds from growing, but lowered to 3-1/2 feet in winter for the safety of ice-skaters.

In its Ninth Annual Report, published in 1866, the park's Board of Commissioners included the following in the list of work completed during the year 1865: "...the excavation of the basin for the larger sheet of water, known as the Harlem Lake, the construction of its banks and dam, and the preparation of the ground to retain the water." In their Tenth Annual Report, published in 1867, the commissioners recorded the completion of the lake during the summer of 1866, noting that, "the surface of the Park at the northeast corner being completed, the water was confined in the Harlem Lake in August last."

=== First reconstruction (1941–1947) ===
On September 21, 1941, the Parks Department announced thirteen new construction projects, the largest of which was the reconstruction of the northeastern corner of Central Park, to include a new boathouse designed by architect Aymar Embury II. According to the department's press release:

...The existing facilities are inadequate to meet the heavy demands of the large adjacent population and the result has been destructive to the natural features. The present layout, a product of the outmoded theory that parks are passive recreation areas designed solely for visual pleasure, must be revamped to fulfill the many recreational needs of all the people of this section of Harlem...A masonry wall about one foot high and a fifteen foot promenade will form the new shore line completely encircling the lake...Benches will be spaced along the lake promenade, the general path system including the trails, and the overlook areas.

The main features of the north shore adjacent to 110 Street will be a U-shaped combination brick boat house, comfort station and refreshment concession with a three hundred and sixty foot boat landing platform thirty feet wide. Two new entrances will be cut through the north wall of the park with stone stairways leading to the boat house plaza...Appropriate trees including willows, oaks and dogwoods and various flowering shrubs will be added to the existing planting.

In March 1943, after approximately half of the project had been completed by the Works Progress Administration, the Parks Department solicited bids to complete enough of the work to reopen the area to the public. By December, the department had reopened Harlem Meer, deferring unessential work on account of the war effort, promising that, "at the end of the war the 360-foot boat landing platform will be completed, and the combination brick boathouse, comfort station, and refreshment concession will be constructed on the north shore of the Meer."

Construction work resumed in 1946, and on August 6, 1947, the Parks Department announced that row boating would resume, the concession to be run out of the new boathouse, "designed in modified victorian style in harmony with the architecture of other structures in the park."

=== Lasker Rink ===
In 1962, Mayor Robert Wagner announced that the Parks Department would build the Loula D. Lasker Memorial Swimming Pool and Skating Rink, designed by the architects Fordyce & Hamby Associates. The structure, built over the mouth of the Loch at the Meer's southwest corner, required that the Meer temporarily be drained. From its completion in 1966 until its removal in 2021, Lasker served as an ice skating rink in winter and as Central Park's only swimming pool in summer.

=== Years of decline (1973–1986) ===
In 1973, the 1940s era boathouse was converted into a restaurant known as Across 110th Street, a short-lived enterprise. In 1984, The New York Times described the building as a "burned-out boathouse." In October that year, Warner LeRoy (operator of Tavern on the Green) and Percy Sutton (a former Manhattan borough president) began negotiating with the Parks Department to install a restaurant in the boathouse. The intent, according to Parks Commissioner Henry Stern, was to attract more people to the Meer. However, the deal fell through and by 1986, the Times reported that the Parks Department and Harlem community leaders had agreed that "the old building should be demolished and a new one put up."

=== Second reconstruction (1990-1993) ===
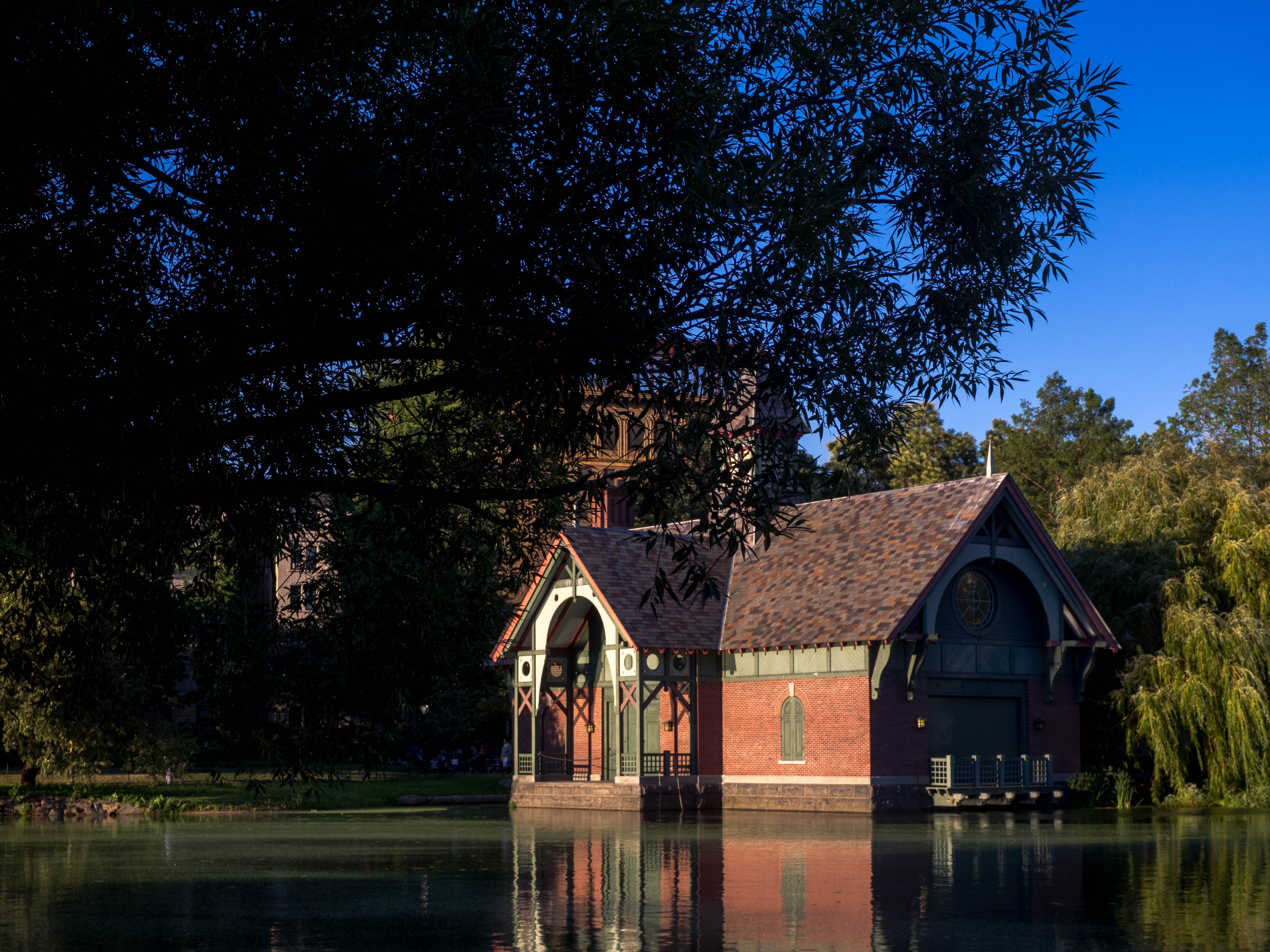
The Dana Discovery Center, seen here in 2015, was built on Harlem Meer in 1993.

Beginning in 1990, the Central Park Conservancy, a non-profit organization founded to help restore the park, undertook the reconstruction of Harlem Meer, demolishing the abandoned boathouse, replacing the concrete perimeter curb with a more natural shoreline, and dredging 40,000 cubic yards (31,000 m^{3}) of sediment and debris from the meer. On the north shore, the Conservancy built the Charles A. Dana Discovery Center, an environmental education center, and the first information center at the north end of Central Park. The 5,200-square-foot (480 m^{2}) building was designed by the architects Buttrick White & Burtis in a style intended to “reinforce the romantic landscape design.” It was completed in 1993. The proposed new restaurant building, in its final iteration three times the size of the Dana Center, and planned to sit just east of it, was never built.

=== Davis Center ===
In 2018, the Central Park Conservancy announced that it planned to remove the Lasker Rink and replace it with a new facility at a cost of $150 million. The new facility was approved by the Public Design Commission on March 30, 2020, and initially scheduled to be completed in 2024. As part of the plan, the existing facility at the southwest end of the rink was demolished and replaced by a new structure at the southeast side, between the rink and East Drive, built partly underground. A new rink and pool were built on the site of the old one, smaller on its southeast–northwest axis, allowing the stream feeding into the Meer to flow visibly above ground for the first time since it was buried in a conduit when the Lasker Rink was built.

In November 2024, the Conservancy announced that the new facility would be known as the Davis Center. The center was completed on April 26, 2025.

== Wildlife ==
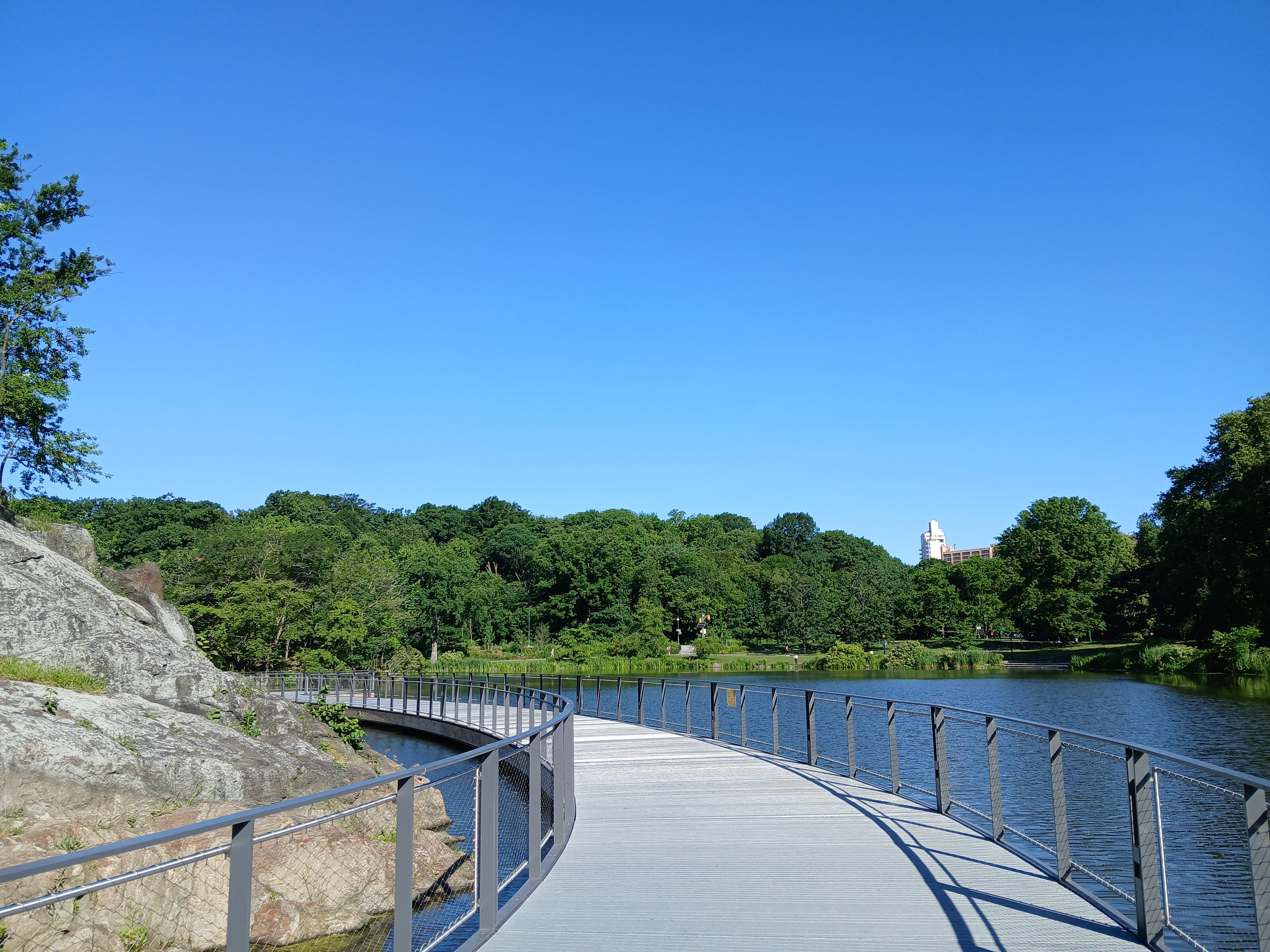
A boardwalk on the southern shore of Harlem Meer

Catch-and-release fishing along the Meer's banks is a favorite activity for some park visitors. Besides the usual yellow perch and crappie, anglers have reported catches of the predatory Asian northern snakehead, Channa argus, a notoriously invasive species.

An island in the southwest corner of the Meer provides a retreat for waterfowl, particularly black-crowned night herons. The Meer has a resident population of muskrats.

== In media ==
=== Literature ===
- Clarence Cook's A Description of the New York Central Park, published in 1869, contains early illustrations of the Harlem Meer by Albert Fitch Bellows.
- Ron P. Swegman's collection of fly-fishing essays, Small Fry: The Lure of the Little, includes details of the Meer's history, and chronicles Swegman's experiences while fly-fishing there in the early years of the 21st century.

=== Film ===
- The film Across 110th Street (1972) contains scenes filmed at Harlem Meer.
- The film Big Daddy (1999) contains scenes filmed at Harlem Meer.

=== Art ===
- The Duke Ellington Memorial, sculpted by Robert Graham, was dedicated in 1997.
- Christo's The Gates installed in Central Park in 2005, from February 12 to February 27, extended to the Harlem Meer.

== Gallery ==
=== Maps ===
A Detail of the 1859 Central Park Map, Before the design of the Harlem Meer was completed.

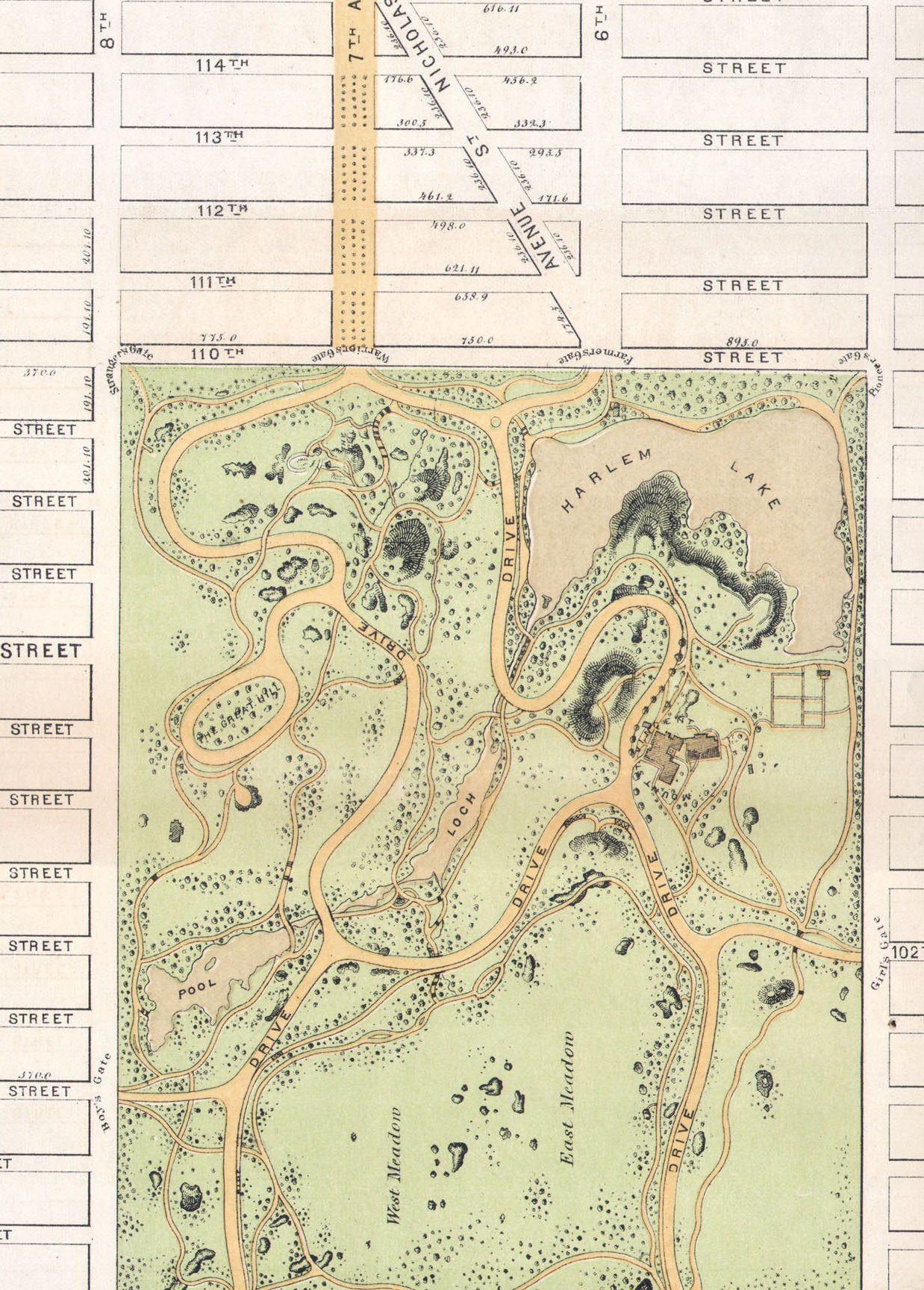
A Detail of an 1868 Map of Central Park including the Harlem Meer (aka Harlem Lake).

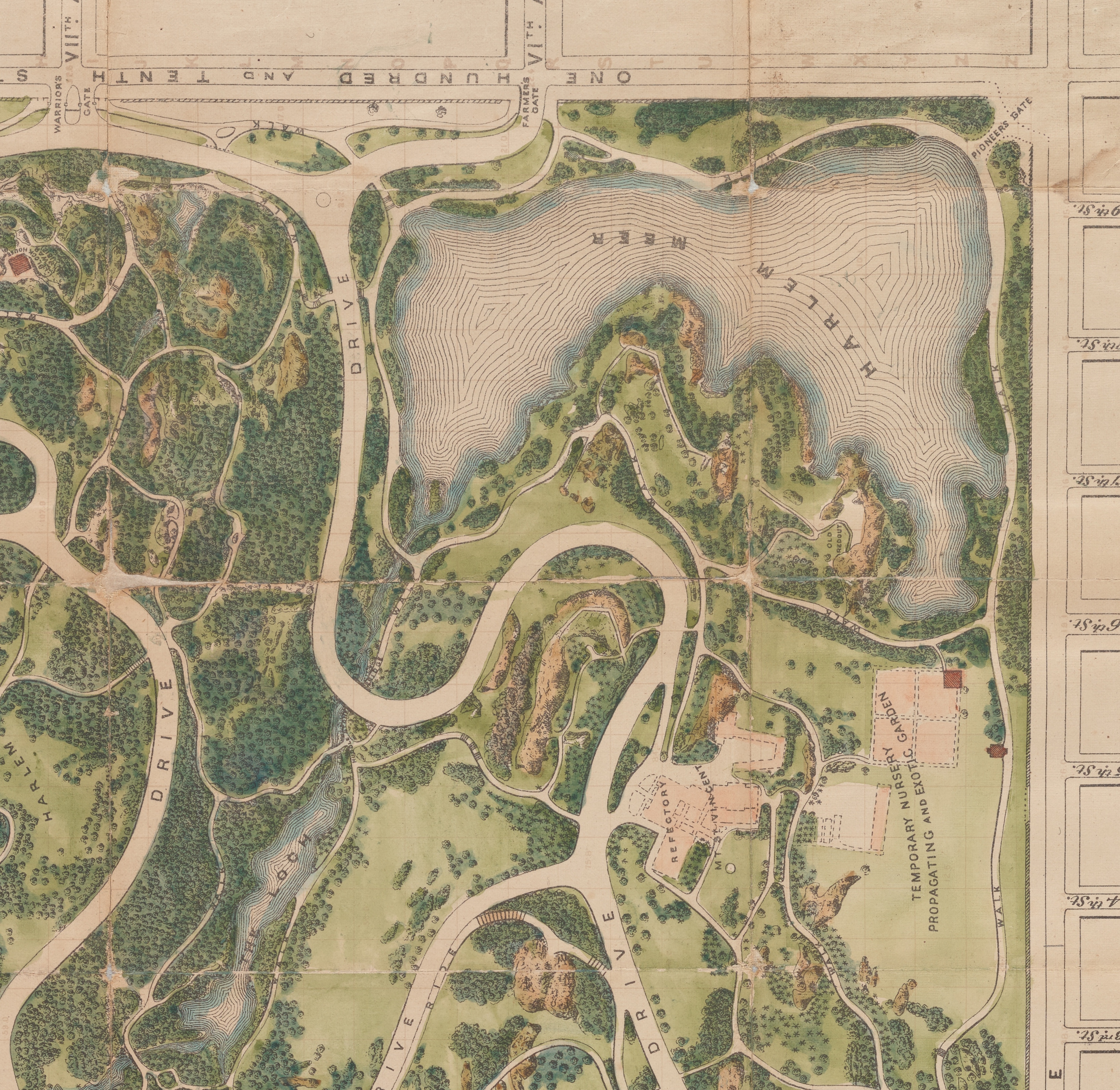
A detail of an 1873 Central Park Map, including the Harlem Meer.

1884 Sanborn Insurance Map including the Harlem Meer (aka Harlem Lake).

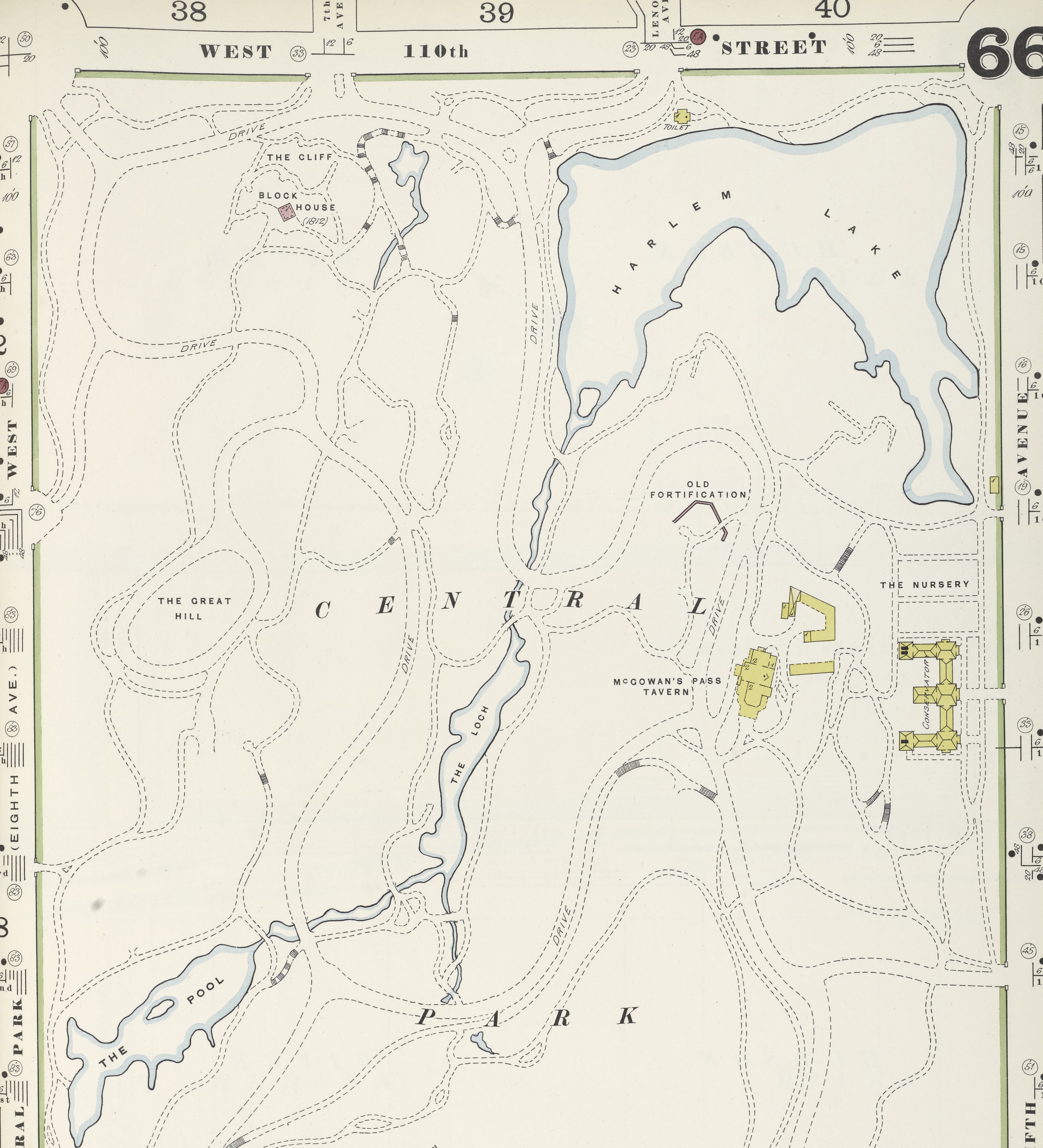
1902 Sanborn Insurance Map including the Harlem Meer (aka Harlem Lake).

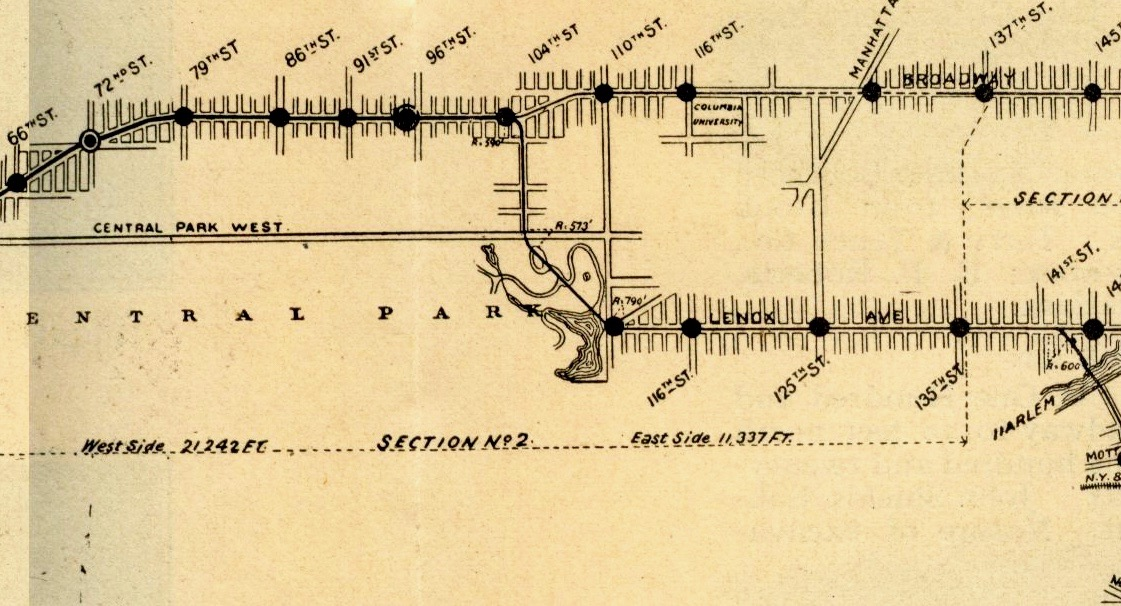
The 1904 subway map shows the IRT subway tunnel just west of Harlem Meer.

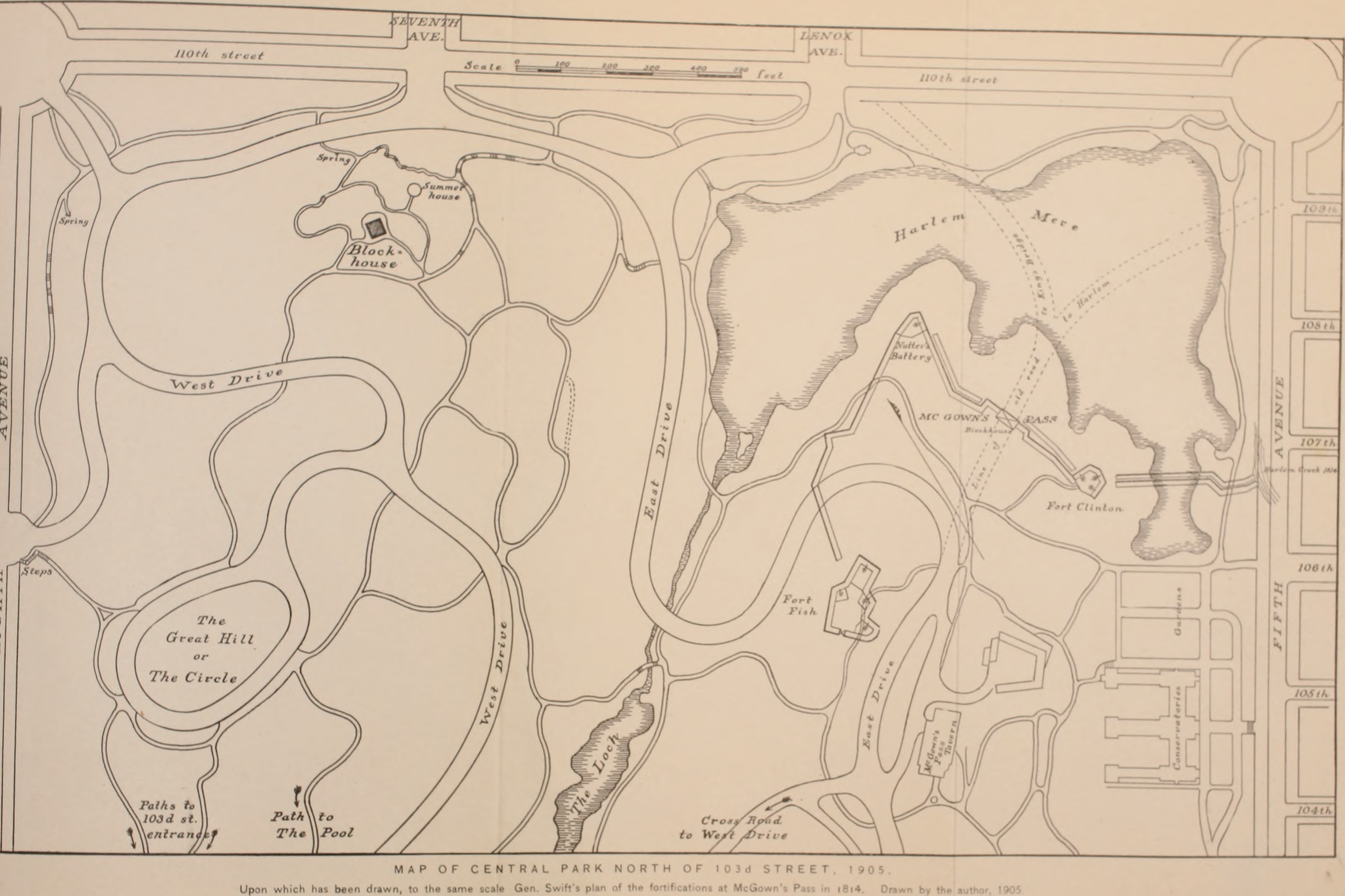
A 1905 map showing the location of fortifications from the War of 1812, built near Harlem Meer.

The 1951 Sanborn Map shows the Meer after the boathouse was built in 1947 on the north shore, but before construction of the Lasker Rink in 1966.

=== Historical drawings and photographs ===
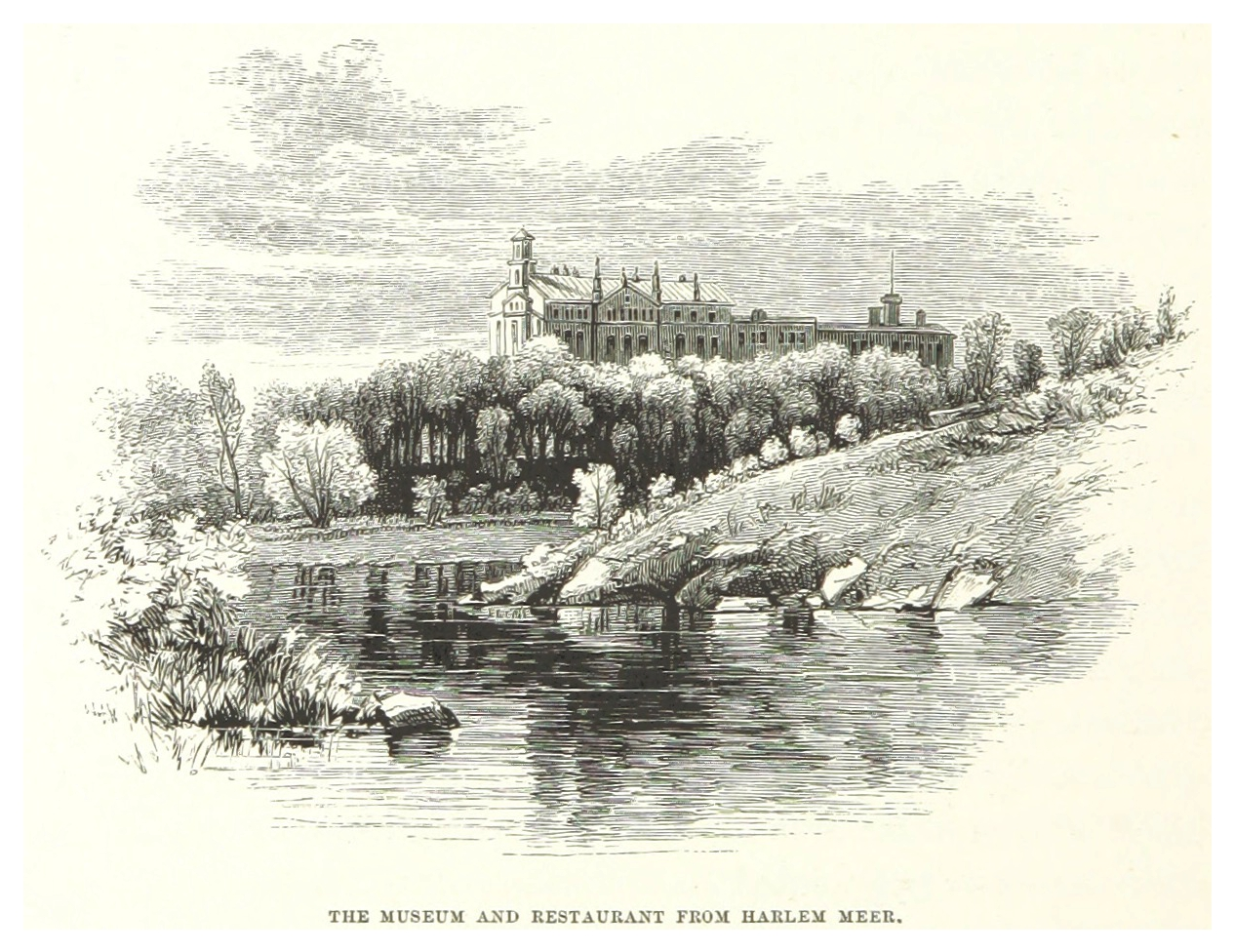
An 1869 View of the Harlem Meer Looking South

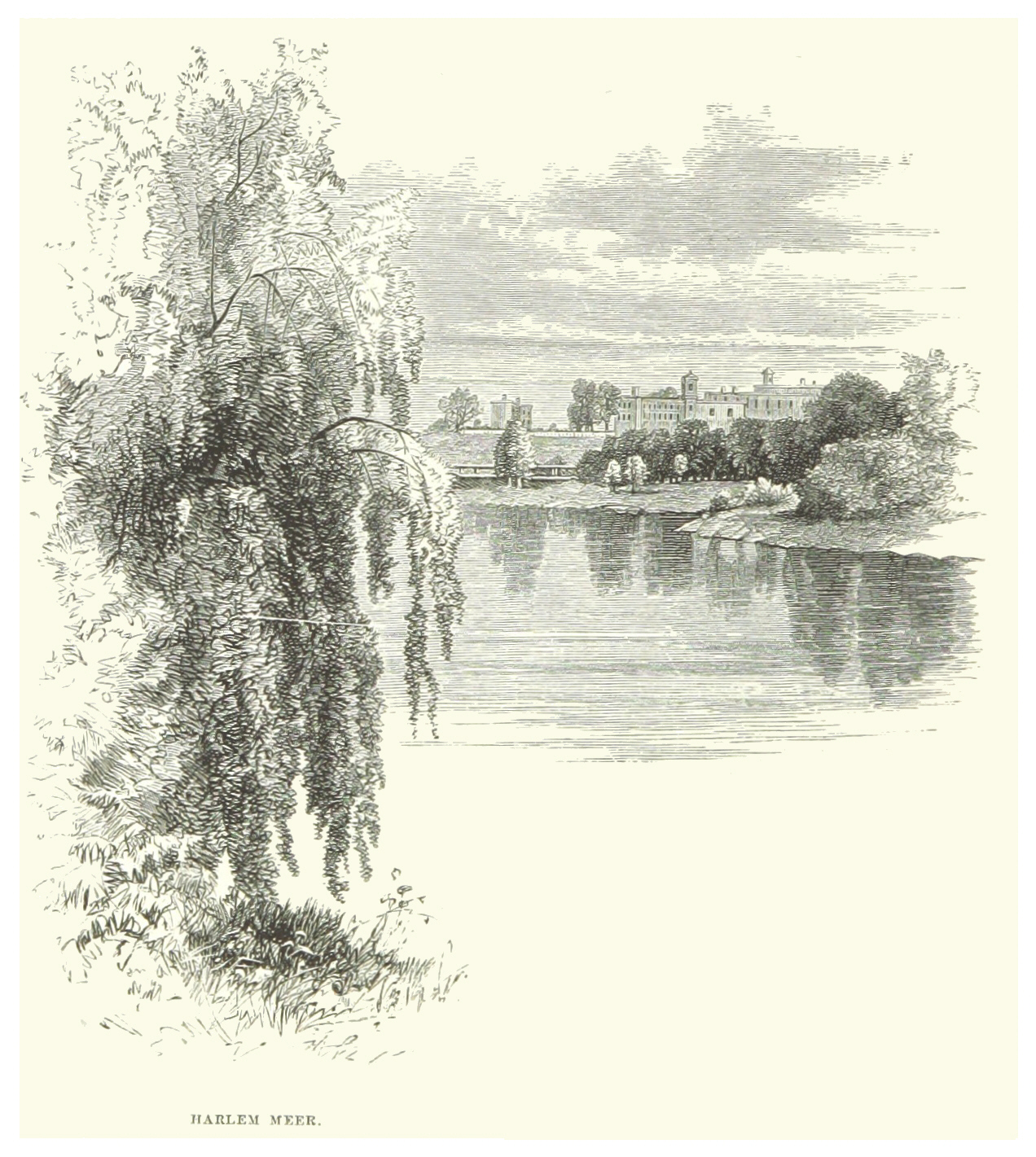
An 1869 View from the Northwest Corner of the Meer

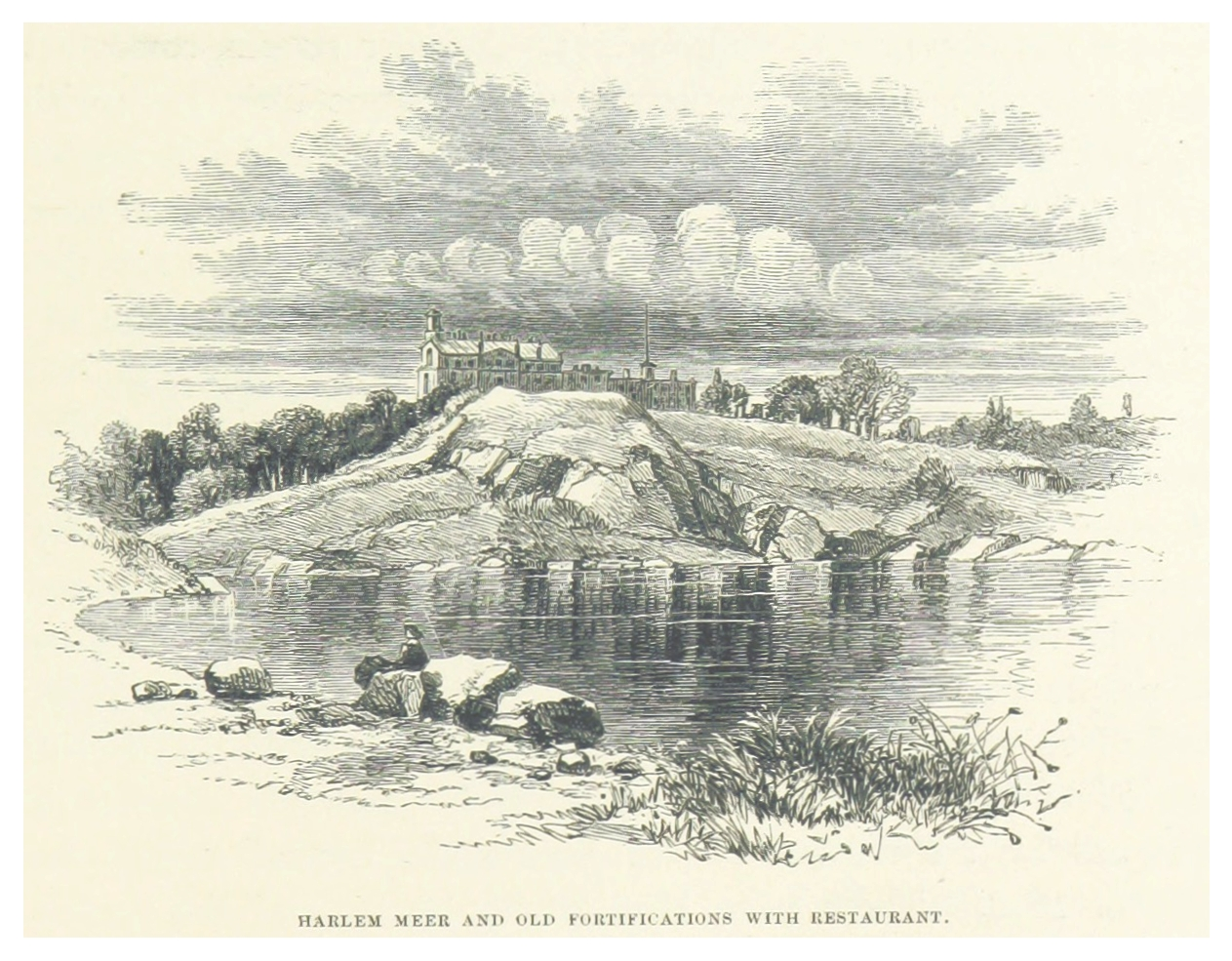
An 1869 View from the Northeast Corner of the Meer

The Comfort Station at Harlem Meer, near the Sixth Avenue park entrance, appears on park maps as early as 1866, and as late as 1944.

Ice skating on Harlem Meer in 1906.

=== Contemporary photographs ===
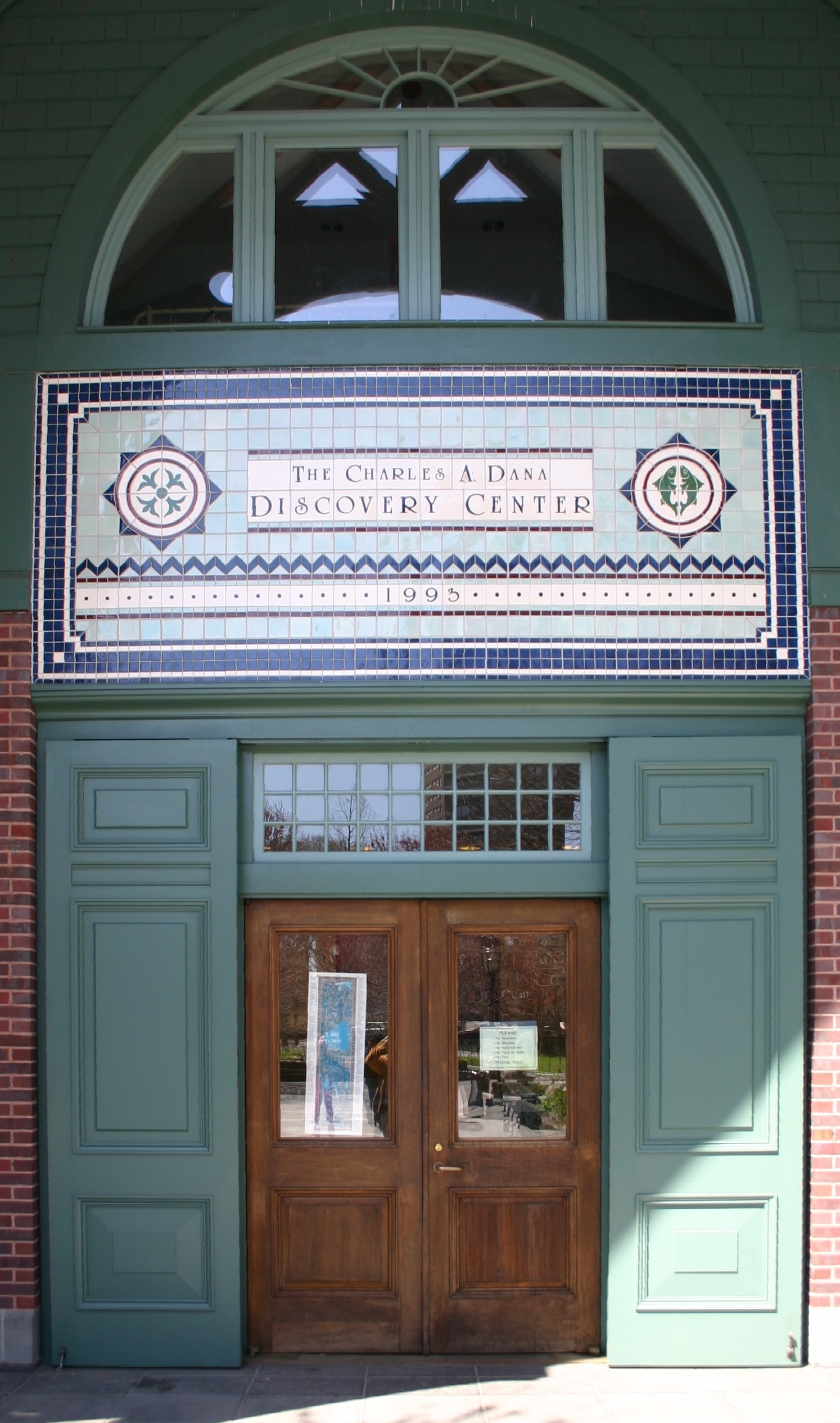
Dana Discovery Center entrance plaque (2005).

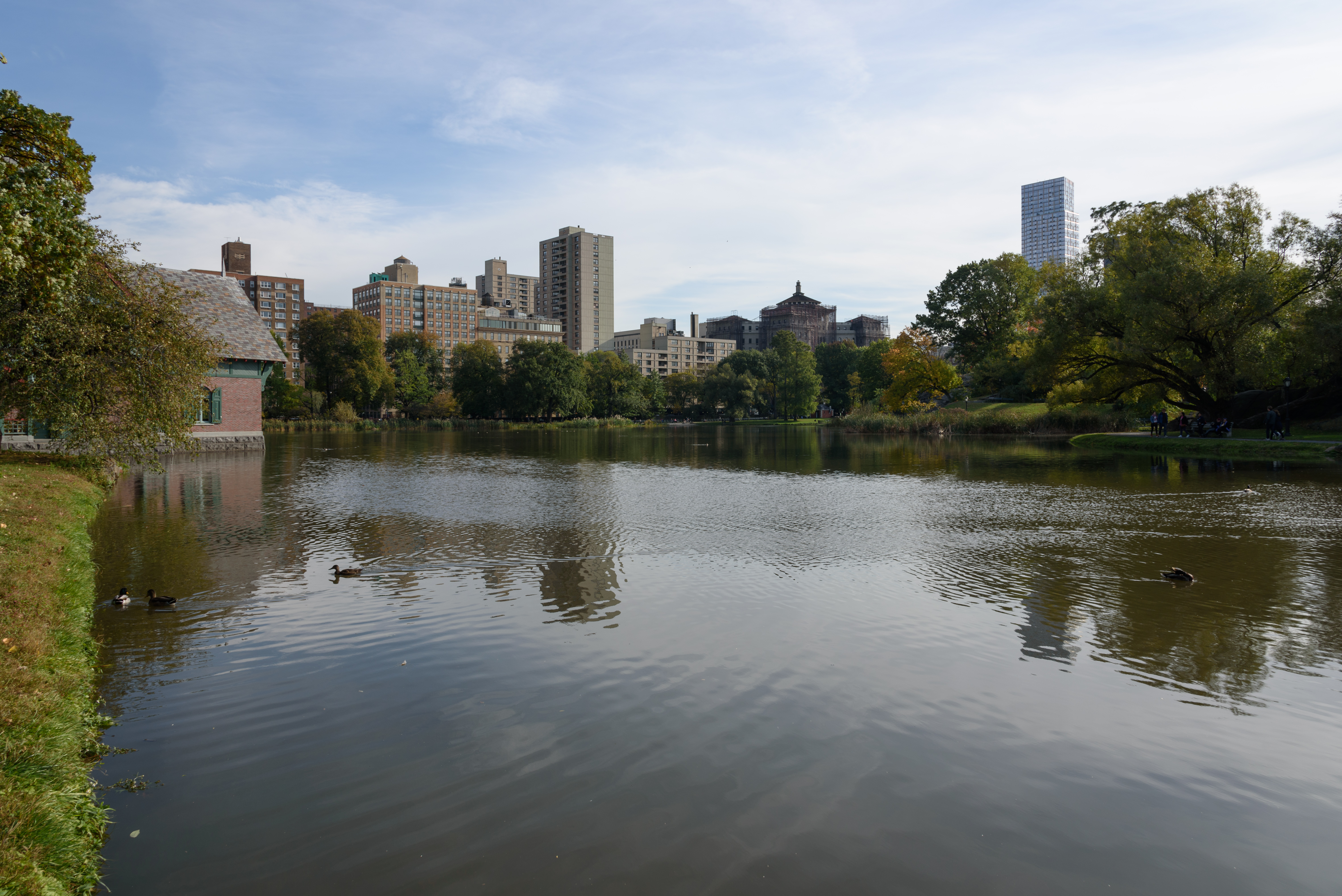
A view from the northwest corner of Harlem Meer (2016).

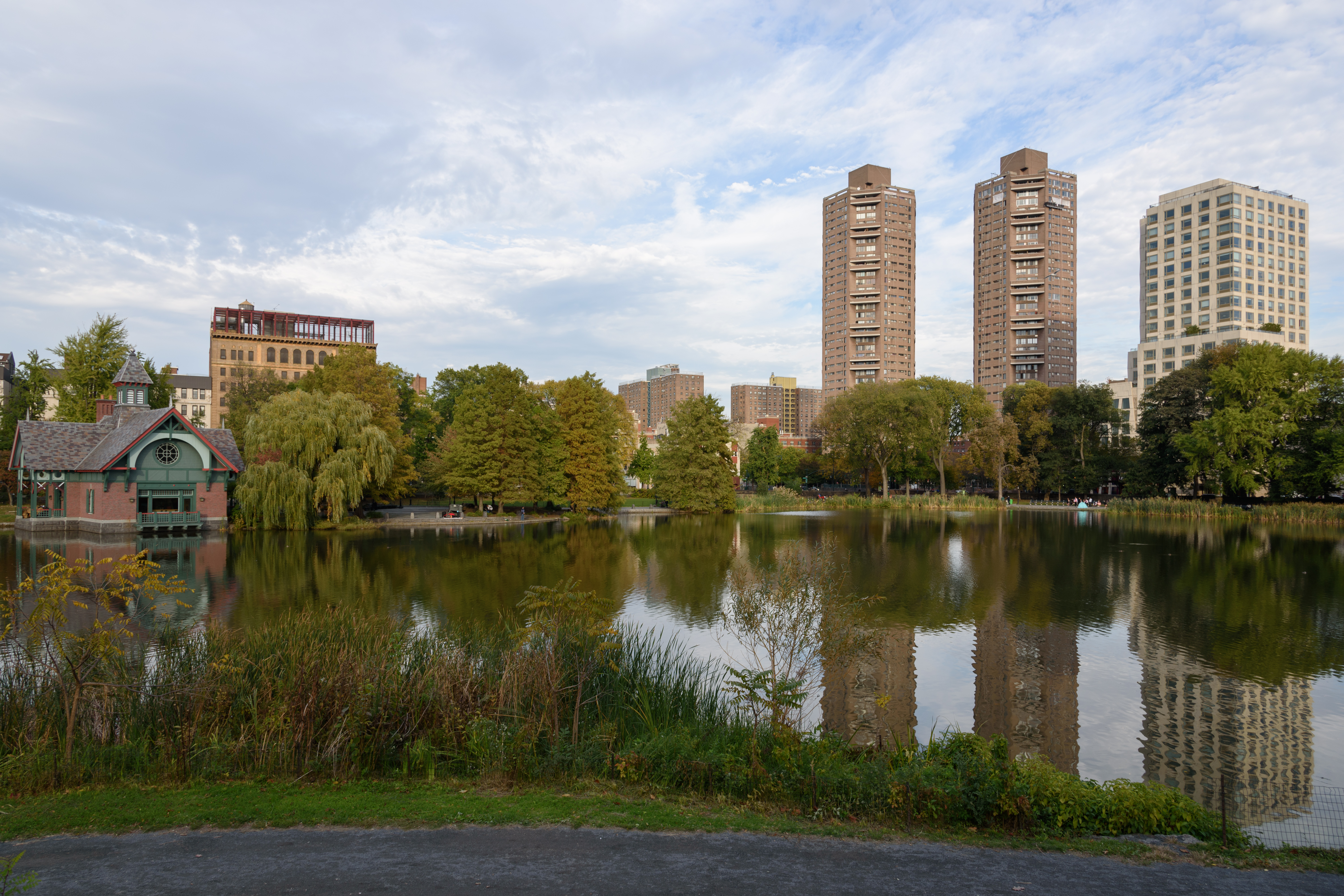
A view from the south shore of Harlem Meer (2016).

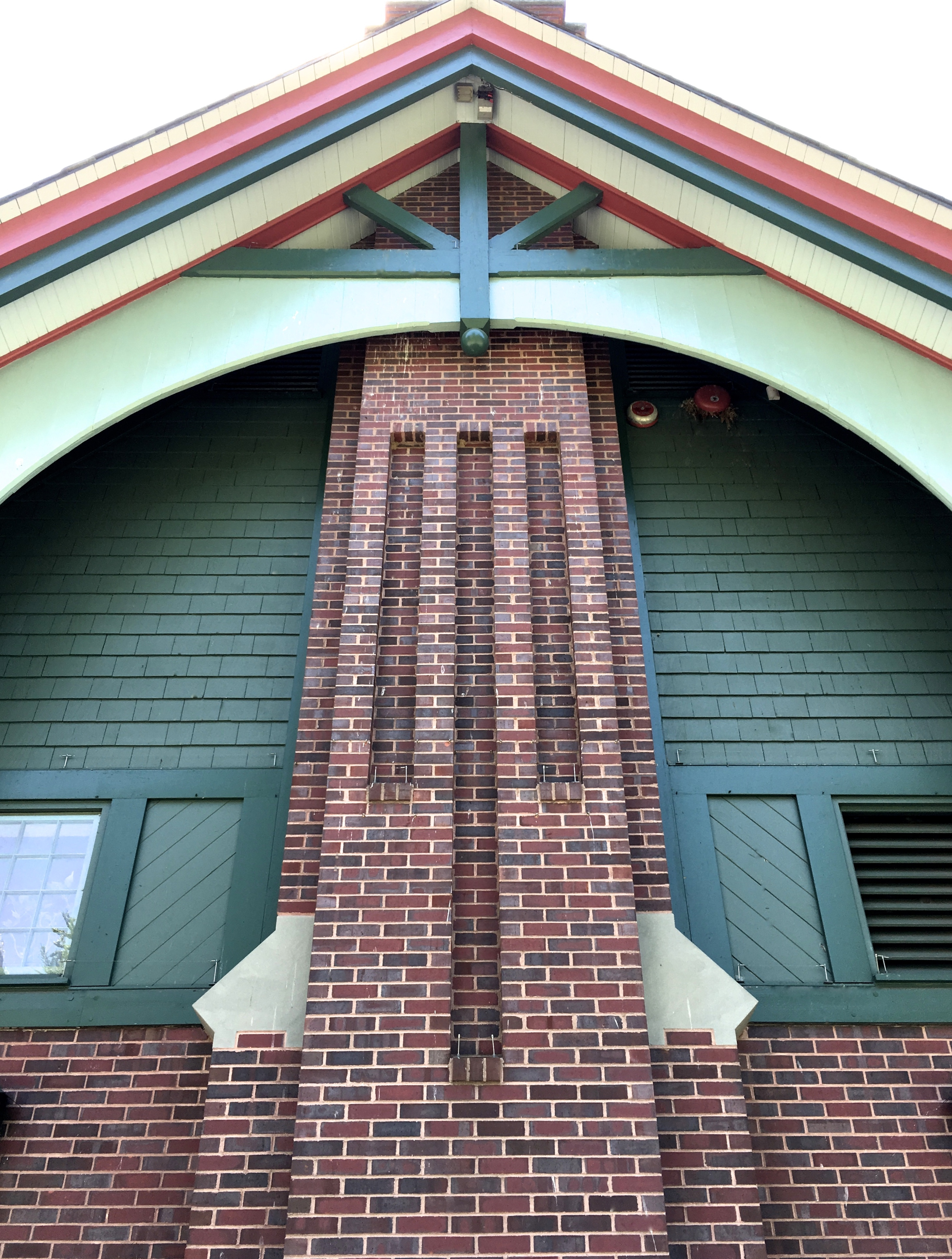
Detail of North Facade of the Dana Discovery Center (2017).

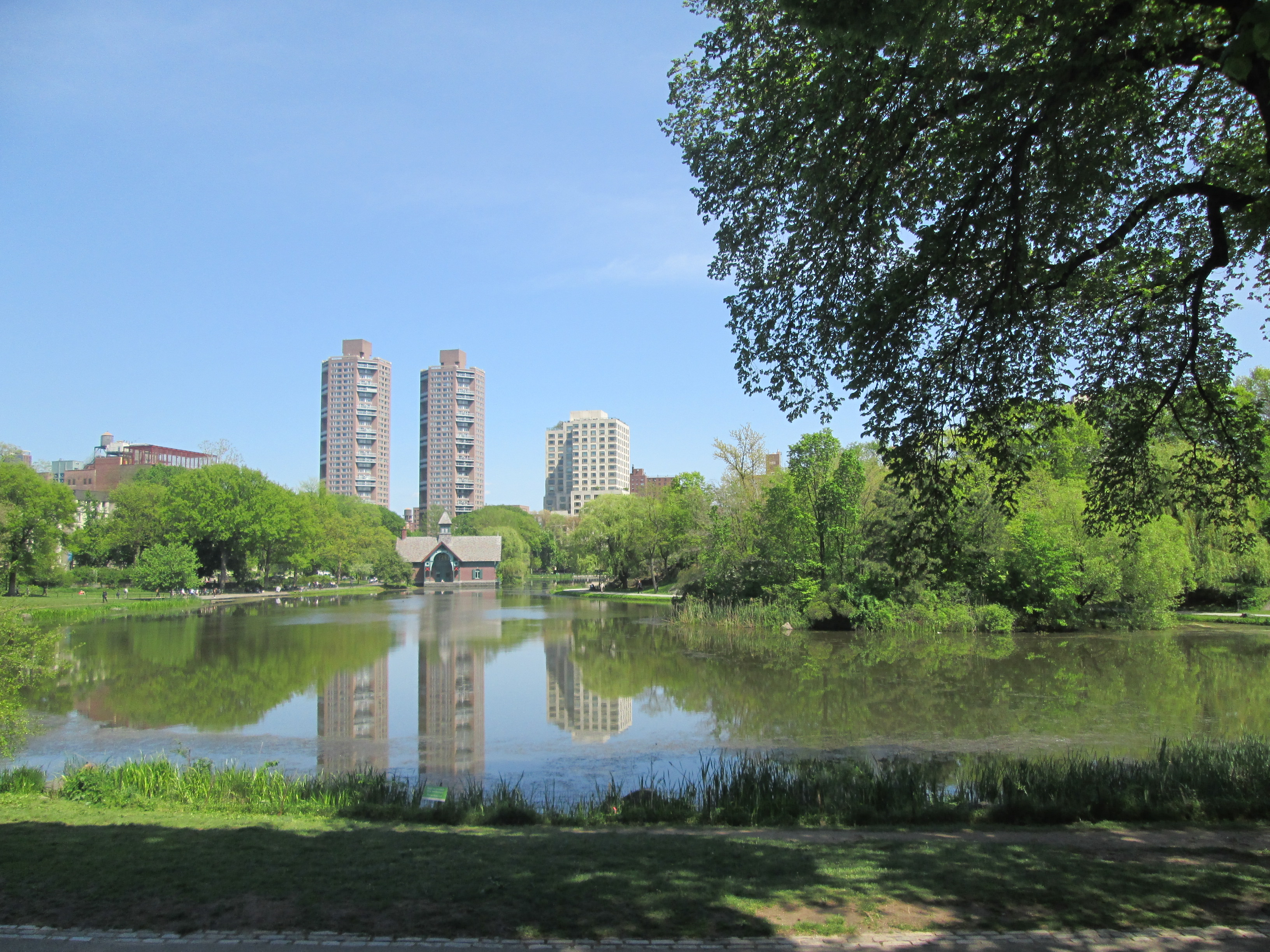
A view from the southwest corner of Harlem Meer (2019).

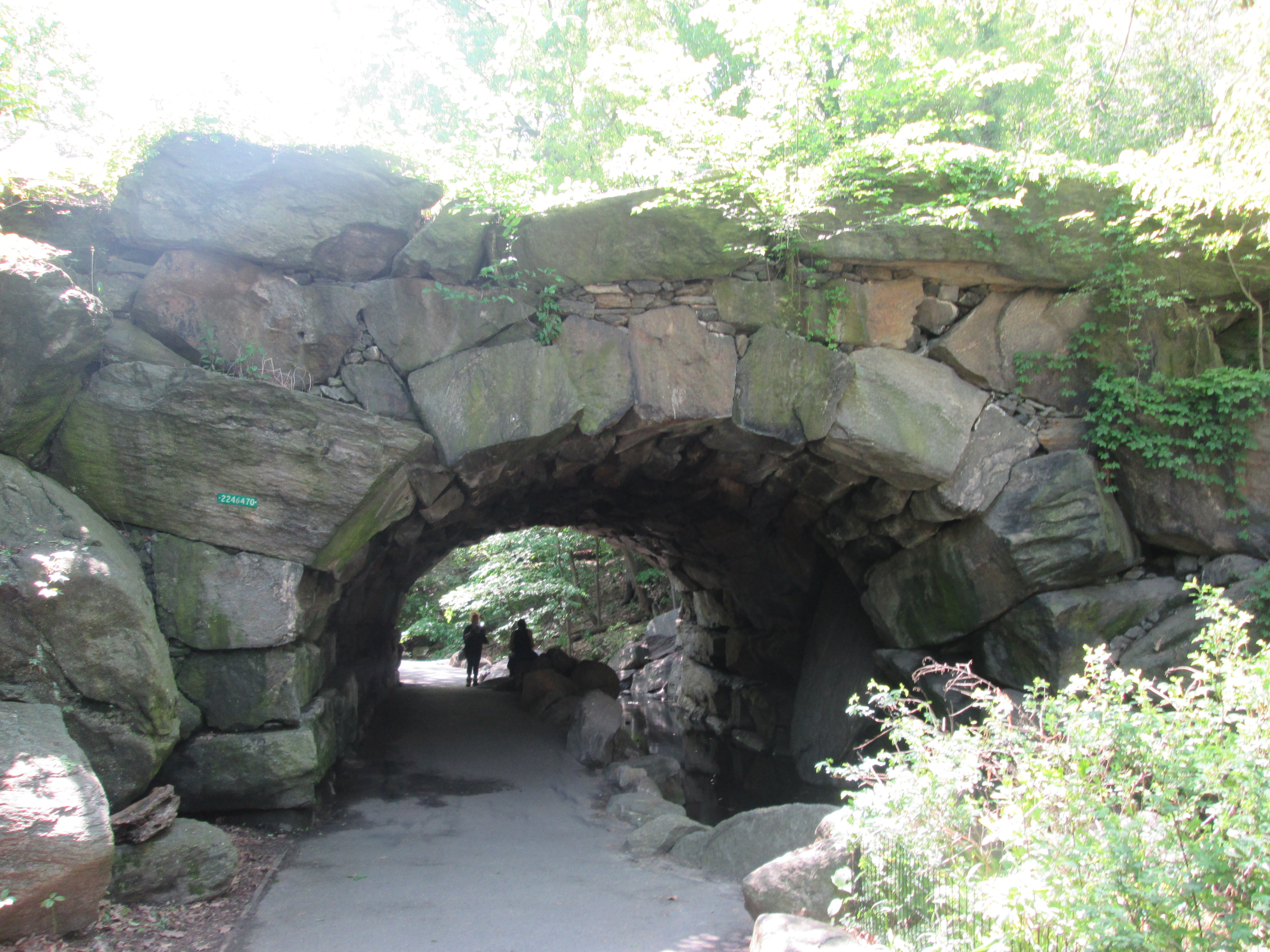
Huddlestone Arch on the East Drive, just south of Harlem Meer (2019).

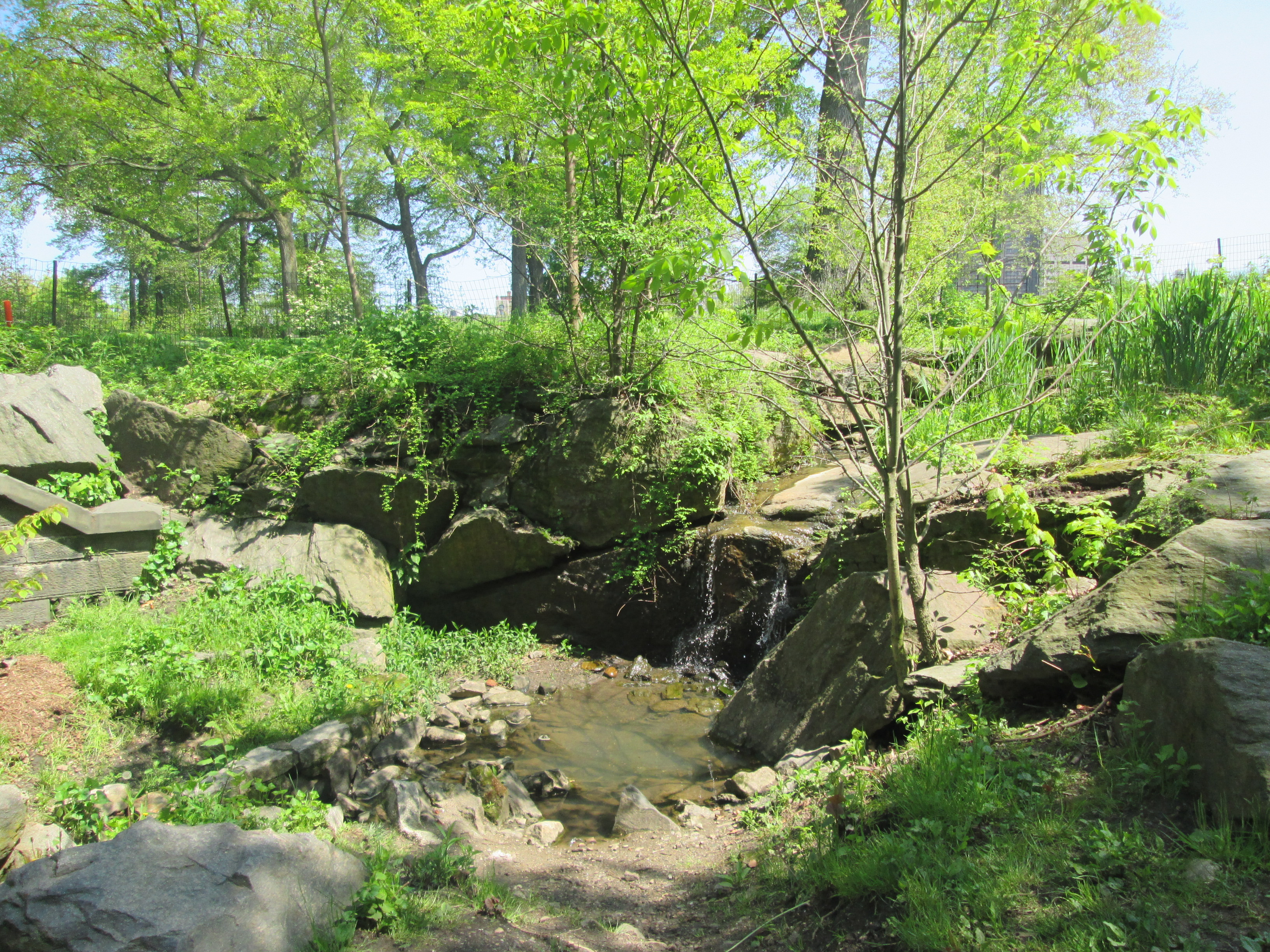
Man-made spring that feeds water into Harlem Meer from the North Meadow drainage system (2019).

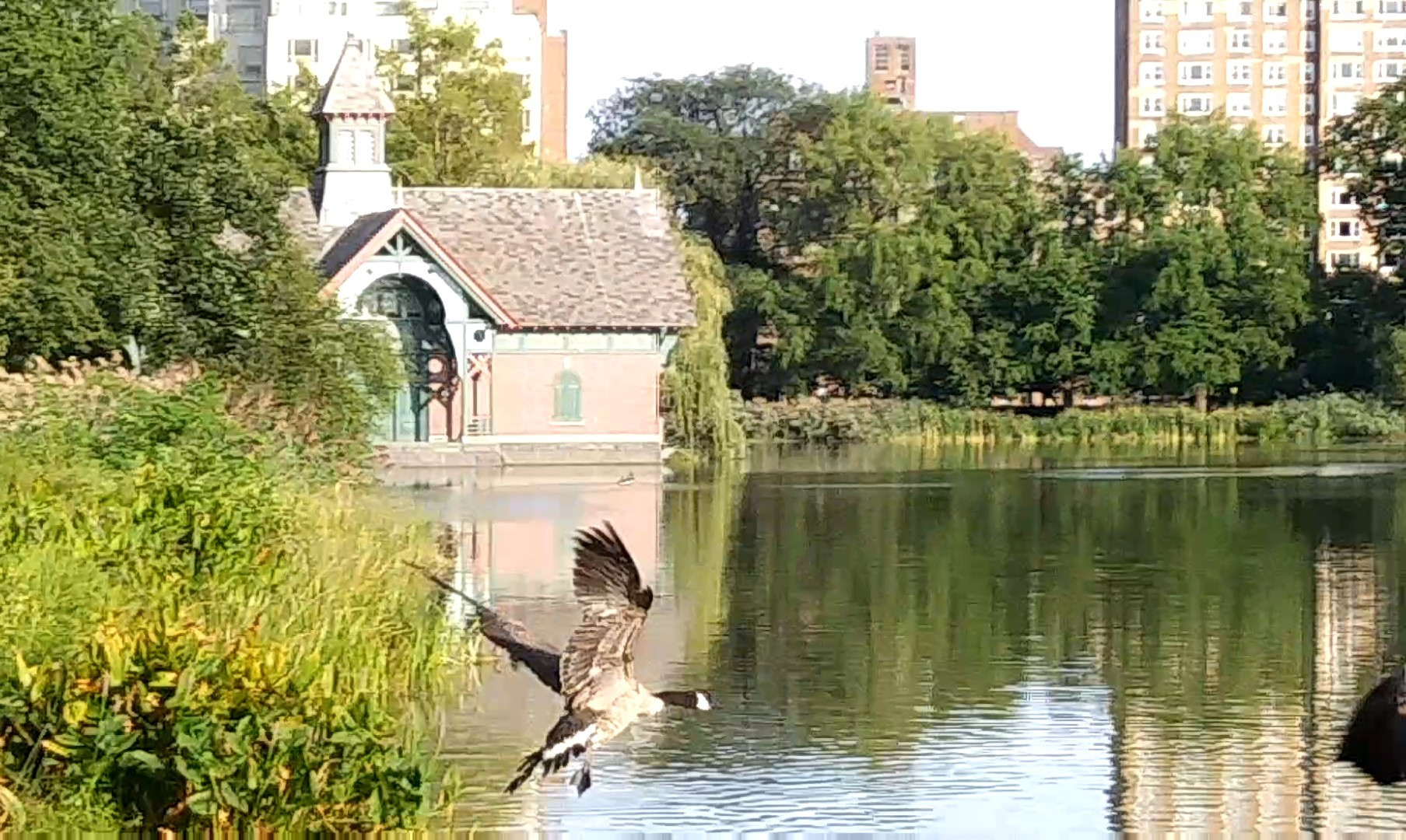
Canada goose flying into the Meer, looking east toward the Dana Discovery Center (2020).

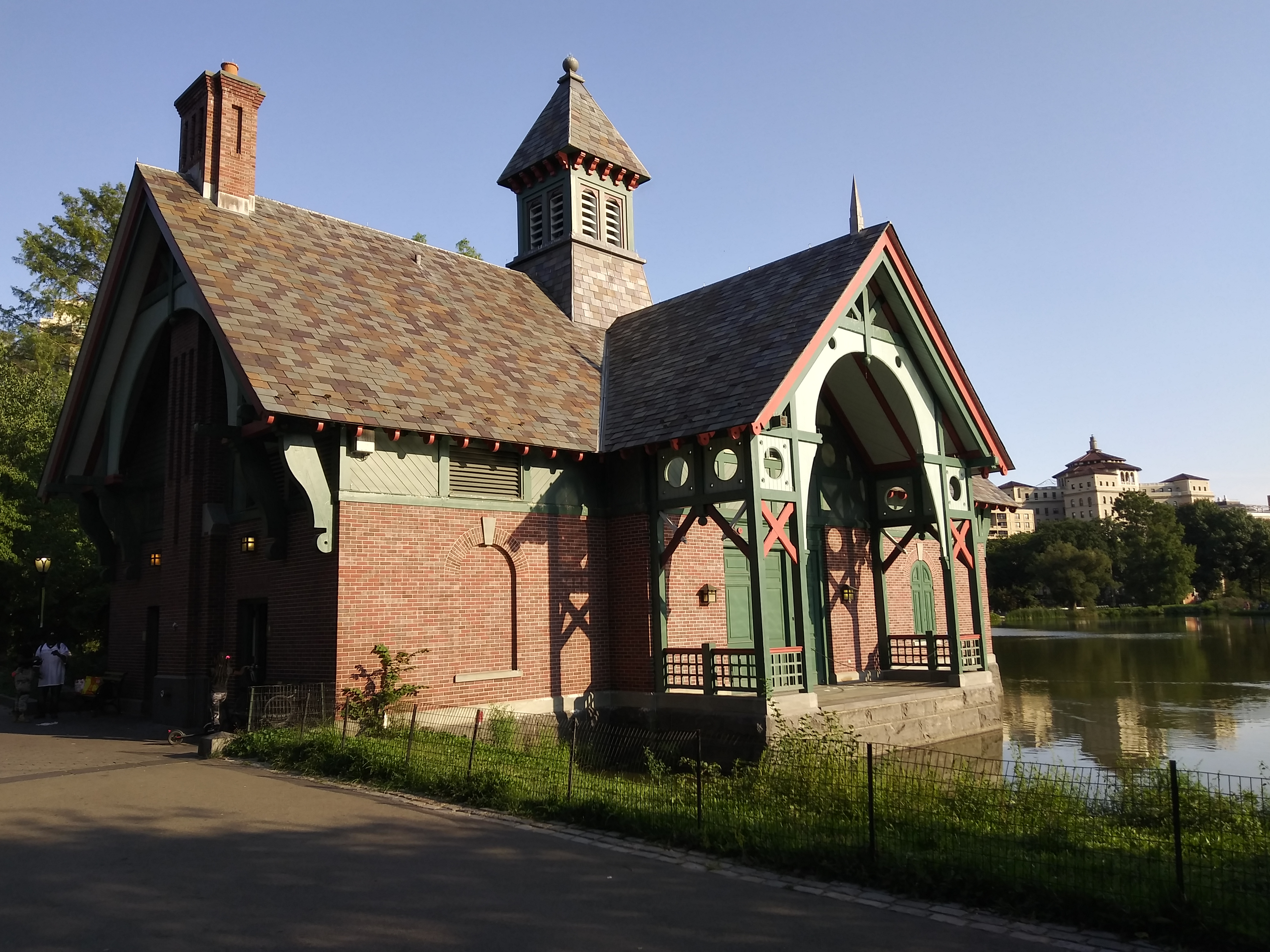
A view of the Dana Discovery Center from the northwest (2020).

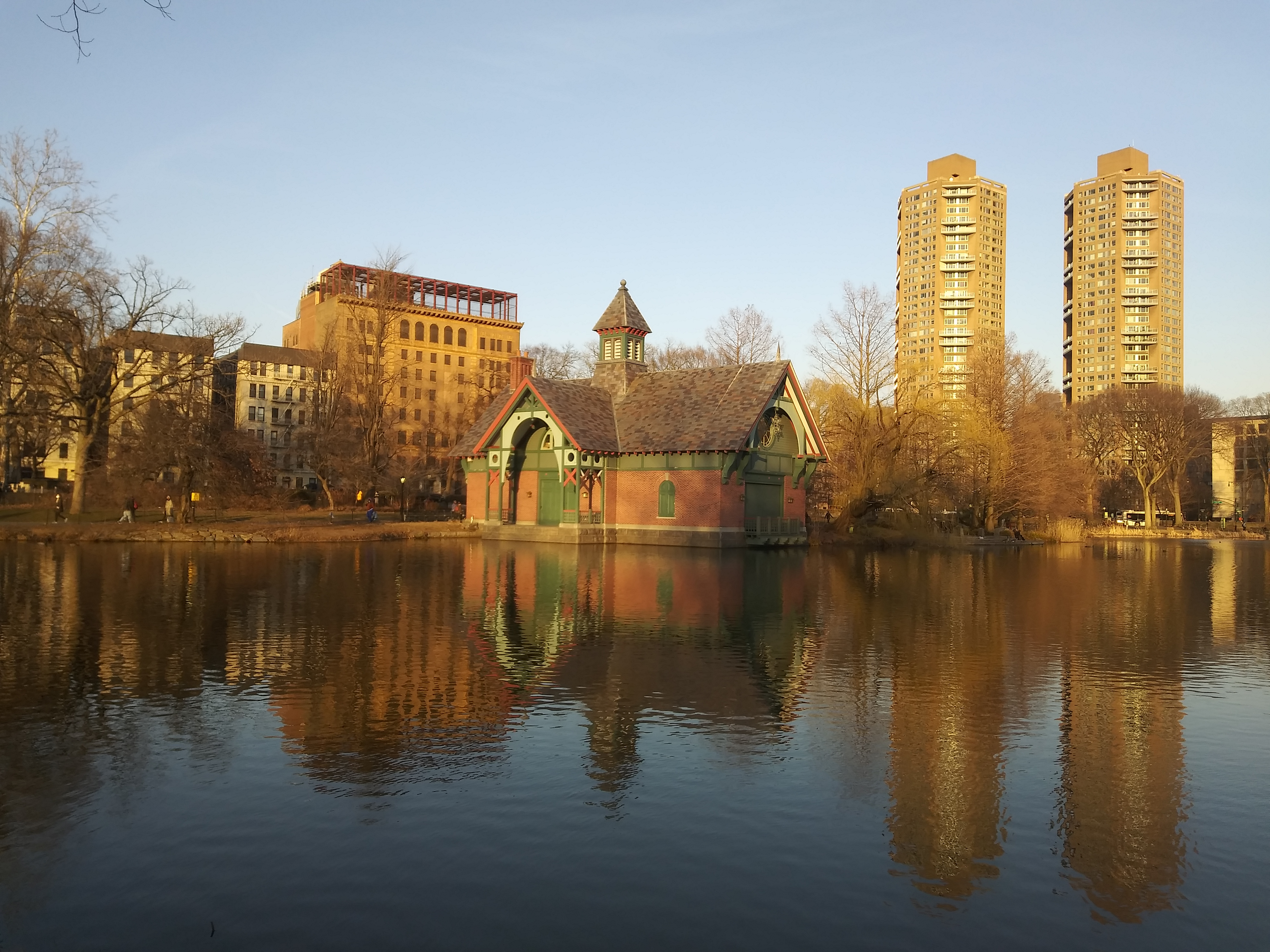
Dana Discovery Center seen from the southwest (2021).

== See also ==
- Public art in Central Park
