= Canadian Society of New York =

The Canadian Society of New York was founded in 1897 to foster a spirit of goodwill between Canada and the United States, and had over a century-long tradition in New York. The Society served as a platform for Canadian government, corporate and cultural leaders to interface with the New York community.

A not-for-profit organization, the Canadian Society of New York organized cultural, social and business events including the Maple Leaf Ball (otherwise known as the Canadian Society of New York Ball). November 14, 2003 marked the Society's 106th annual Maple Leaf Ball at Manhattan's Waldorf Astoria Hotel. This black-tie event honored two Canadians who devoted much of their careers to championing an ongoing partnership between Canada and the United States: Senator Jerry Grafstein, Q.C and Pamela Wallin, Canada's Consul General to New York. The Society also ran the Hockey Achievement Award Dinner. They also support cancer research, Canada's National Ballet School, and more.

On January 1, 2005, the Canadian Society of New York merged with the Canadian Club of New York to become the Canadian Association of New York Incorporated.

Officers, Directors and Past Presidents of the Canadian Society of New York (listed in alphabetical order):

- Gordon V. Adams (Past President)
- Gary Ball (Past President)
- Peter A. E. Bethlenfalvy (Past President)
- John Birkett (Past President)
- Richard Binhammer (Director)
- Nicola Clayton (Director)
- Alison Dalglish (Director)
- Philip C. Daly (Past President)
- Philippe David (President)
- Chris Davis (Director)
- Edward D. Hunter (Past President)
- Paul M. Levesque (Vice President)
- Karen A. McNamara (Past President)
- Andrew W. Nelson, Esq. (Director)
- Kara Newman (Director)
- James D. Otton (Treasurer)
- Kenneth A. Paterson (Past President)
- D. Nicholas Radford (Past President)
- Brendan T. Redmond (Secretary)
- Kenneth D. Taylor (Past President)
- Walter S. Tomenson, Jr. (Past President)
- Elizabeth Vilmik (Vice President)

== See also ==
- Canada-United States relations
