= Arthur Ross (philanthropist) =

American businessman and philanthropist

- Born: November 25, 1910; Manhattan, New York City, U.S.
- Died: September 10, 2007 (aged 96); East Hampton, New York, U.S.
- Education: University of Pennsylvania; Columbia University (BA)
- Occupations: Businessman; philanthropist
- Employer: Central National-Gottesman
- Known for: Namesake of Arthur Ross Pinetum

Arthur Ross (November 25, 1910 – September 10, 2007) was an American businessman and philanthropist. He was known for his philanthropic contributions to the arts and environmental causes, including New York City's Central Park, specifically the Arthur Ross Pinetum, as well as the Arthur Ross Greenhouse at Barnard College.

== Early life ==
Arthur Ross was born in Manhattan, New York City, on November 25, 1910. Ross originally enrolled at the University of Pennsylvania in Philadelphia but transferred to Columbia University during the Great Depression to support his family. He graduated from Columbia University in 1931. He held a number of jobs during the Depression and his college years, including a shirt salesman at Macy's.

Ross joined the United States Navy during World War II. He served as a lieutenant commander. His tours of duty took him to Ecuador and Panama for several years.

== Career ==
Ross began his career in 1932 at Sutro Brothers & Company, a Wall Street brokerage firm. He left the company in 1938 and joined Central National Corporation the same year. Central National Corporation was an investment banking subsidiary of Gottesman & Company, a privately held company specializing in chemicals and wood pulp. Ross stayed at Central National and rose to become vice president of the combined parent company, now called Central National-Gottesman Inc., in 1974.

== Philanthropy ==
Ross worked on a number of important philanthropic causes throughout his life. Most involved the arts, the environment and international affairs. In 1982, he established the annual Arthur Ross Awards of the Institute of Classical Architecture & Art.

=== Central Park ===
==== Arthur Ross Pinetum ====
Ross began to finance the establishment of the Arthur Ross Pinetum in 1971 with Cornelius O'Shea, Central Park's chief forester. The pinetum, located to the northwest of Central Park's Great Lawn, covers 4 acres (1.6 ha) of Central Park. The Arthur Ross Pinetum is currently home to a collection of 25 species of conifers, from both the United States and other countries. Ross stayed actively involved in the pinetum, despite some instances of early vandalism. Ross added approximately 35 pine trees a year to the Arthur Ross Pinetum. His collection grew to include trees from the Himalayas, Macedonia and Japan. The pinetum became a popular recreational area for New Yorkers. Wendy Wasserstein, a New York City based playwright, called the Arthur Ross Pinetum "a little bit of Maine in Manhattan."

==== Central Park Conservancy ====
Ross became a board member of the Central Park Conservancy in 1980. Ross continued to work for the survival and renewal of Central Park. He sponsored an exhibition about Central Park at the Cooper-Hewitt National Design Museum in 1980. A second Ross sponsored exhibition of Central Park was held at the Metropolitan Museum of Art in 1981.

Ross financed the research and development of a subspecies of Chinese elm, developed by researchers from a tree grown in Central Park. The descendants of this particular subspecies have been used in Central Park and worldwide to replace elm species destroyed by Dutch elm disease. The Ross financed subspecies is immune to the disease.

Ross also contributed anonymously to other public New York City parks and other facilities. Among his contributions was a $350,000 donation to a city-owned nursery in the Bronx.
