= Elizabeth W. Smith =

American government administrator

President and CEO of the Central Park Conservancy
- Incumbent
- Assumed office March 1, 2018
- Preceded by: Douglas Blonsky

Assistant Commissioner of the New York City Department of Parks and Recreation
- In office 2002–2013

Personal details
- Born: Rye, New York, U.S.
- Party: Republican
- Education: Scripps College

Elizabeth Weinberg Smith (born 1952 or 1953) is an American non-profit administrator and former government employee, currently serving as the president and CEO of the Central Park Conservancy, the New York City nonprofit that raises 75% of Central Park's annual budget and is responsible for management of the 843-acre park. In the role, Smith oversees strategic planning, park operations, capital programming, public programming, development, marketing, and communication strategies.

Smith previously served as Assistant Commissioner of New York City Department of Parks and Recreation under Mayor Michael Bloomberg following a 25-year career in finance.

== Early life ==
Smith was born in 1952 or 1953. She grew up in Rye, New York, and graduated from Rye Country Day School and Scripps College, where she was elected to Phi Beta Kappa. After graduating from college, Smith moved to the Upper East Side of Manhattan.

== Career ==
Smith assumed the role of president and CEO of the Central Park Conservancy on March 1, 2018. Prior to her appointment, she served on the Board of the Conservancy since 2014 and on the Advisory Board of the Institute for Urban Parks, the Conservancy's educational arm.

Smith previously served as NYC Parks Assistant Commissioner during the Bloomberg administration, with responsibility for the agency's concession portfolio as well as its annual roster of all major special events on city parkland. In addition, she managed relationships with an expanding portfolio of conservancies and other public-private partnerships, serving as principal liaison with the agency. During her tenure, she also oversaw the marketing and corporate sponsorship departments as well as numerous special projects focused on strategic planning, staffing models, and branding. On March 30, 2011, she was presented with NYC Parks’ Commissioner's Award for her outstanding leadership.

After leaving NYC Parks at the end of the Bloomberg Administration in 2013, Smith remained an active supporter of urban parks and open spaces. Until March 1, 2018, she served as a board member of Friends of the High Line and the Open Space Institute, and as Vice Chair of New Yorkers for Parks, in addition to her role on the Central Park Conservancy's Board of Trustees.

Prior to joining New York City Department of Parks and Recreation, Smith had a 25-year career in finance. She started her professional career in commercial banking at JPMorgan Chase before transitioning to venture capital and private equity management at Prospect Group Inc. and at the family offices of Harry F. Oppenheimer and the Rockefeller Financial Group. She later ran client services and finance at Sotheby's before joining the Bloomberg administration in 2002.

In addition to her involvement in parks and open spaces, Smith is Chair of the Board of the Library of America, a nonprofit publisher of significant American writing. She previously was a longtime board member of the Chamber Music Society of Lincoln Center and Scripps College.

== Personal life ==
Smith married Rick Cotton in 2011. Cotton was appointed by Andrew Cuomo in 2017 to run the Port Authority of New York & New Jersey. On 9 March 2020, it was reported that Smith and her husband both had been infected by SARS-CoV-2, the virus that causes coronavirus disease 2019. The couple were reported to have self-quarantined in their home.
