= Rick Cotton =

American lawyer and government official

Executive Director of the Port Authority of New York and New Jersey
- In office August 14, 2017 – February 8, 2026
- Governor: Andrew Cuomo; Phil Murphy; Kathy Hochul; Mikie Sherrill
- Preceded by: Pat Foye
- Succeeded by: Kathryn Garcia

Personal details
- Born: 1943 or 1944 (age 81–82)
- Education: Harvard University (BA); Yale University (JD)

Richard Cotton (born 1943 or 1944) was the executive director of the Port Authority of New York and New Jersey. He assumed this role in August 2017 and was expected to retire in January 2026.

== Early life and education ==
Cotton was born in 1945 or 1946 in the Hyde Park neighborhood of Chicago. His mother, Sylvia Cotton, founded Illinois Action for Children, a nonprofit that focuses on ensuring all children, especially those facing poverty and racial injustice, have access the high-quality child care and early education they need to succeed in school and in life. His father, Eugene Cotton, served as a labor lawyer. Cotton has a BA from Harvard University and a JD from Yale Law School.

== Career ==
=== Early career ===
After graduating from Yale Law School, Cotton served as a law clerk to Judge J. Skelly Wright on United States Court of Appeals for the District of Columbia Circuit from 1969 to 1970. He subsequently clerked for Justice William J. Brennan Jr. on Supreme Court of the United States from 1970 to 1971.

=== Private sector ===
Cotton worked at NBCUniversal for 25 years. During this time, he spent 20 years as Executive Vice President and General Counsel. He also served for four years as president and managing director of CNBC Europe, based in London.

=== Government ===
Cotton has served in various governmental roles throughout his career. He was Executive Secretary to the Department of Health, Education and Welfare under Secretary Joseph A. Califano Jr. He later worked as Special Assistant for Renewable Energy to Deputy Secretary John Sawhill at the U.S. Department of Energy.

From 2015 to 2017, Cotton worked for New York Governor Andrew Cuomo as Special Counsellor to the Governor for Interagency Initiatives. In this role, he focused on infrastructure projects in downstate New York, including LaGuardia and JFK Airports, the Moynihan Train Hall and Penn-Farley Complex, the Governor Mario M. Cuomo Bridge (formerly Tappan Zee Bridge), the Jacob K. Javits Convention Center expansion, and the Metropolitan Transportation Authority's Second Avenue Subway project. New York Governor Andrew Cuomo reportedly referred to Cotton as New York's “czar of infrastructure."

=== Port Authority of New York and New Jersey ===
In August 2017, Cotton was appointed executive director of the Port Authority of New York and New Jersey, the bi-state agency responsible for managing regional transportation infrastructure including airports, tunnels, bridges, ports, and the World Trade Center site.

Cotton retired from the role in January 2026.

== Personal life ==
Cotton married Elizabeth W. Smith, the Assistant Commissioner of New York City Department of Parks and Recreation, in 2011.

On March 9, 2020, New York governor Andrew Cuomo announced that Cotton had been infected by SARS-CoV-2, the virus that causes coronavirus disease 2019. His wife also tested positive for the virus, and the couple were reported to have self-quarantined in their home. Cuomo reported on March 22 that Cotton had recovered from SARS-CoV-2 without having been hospitalized.

== See also ==
- List of law clerks for the third seat of the Supreme Court of the United States
