= Arthur Ross Greenhouse =

Greenhouse at Barnard College, New York City

Coordinates: 40°48′38″N 73°57′46″W

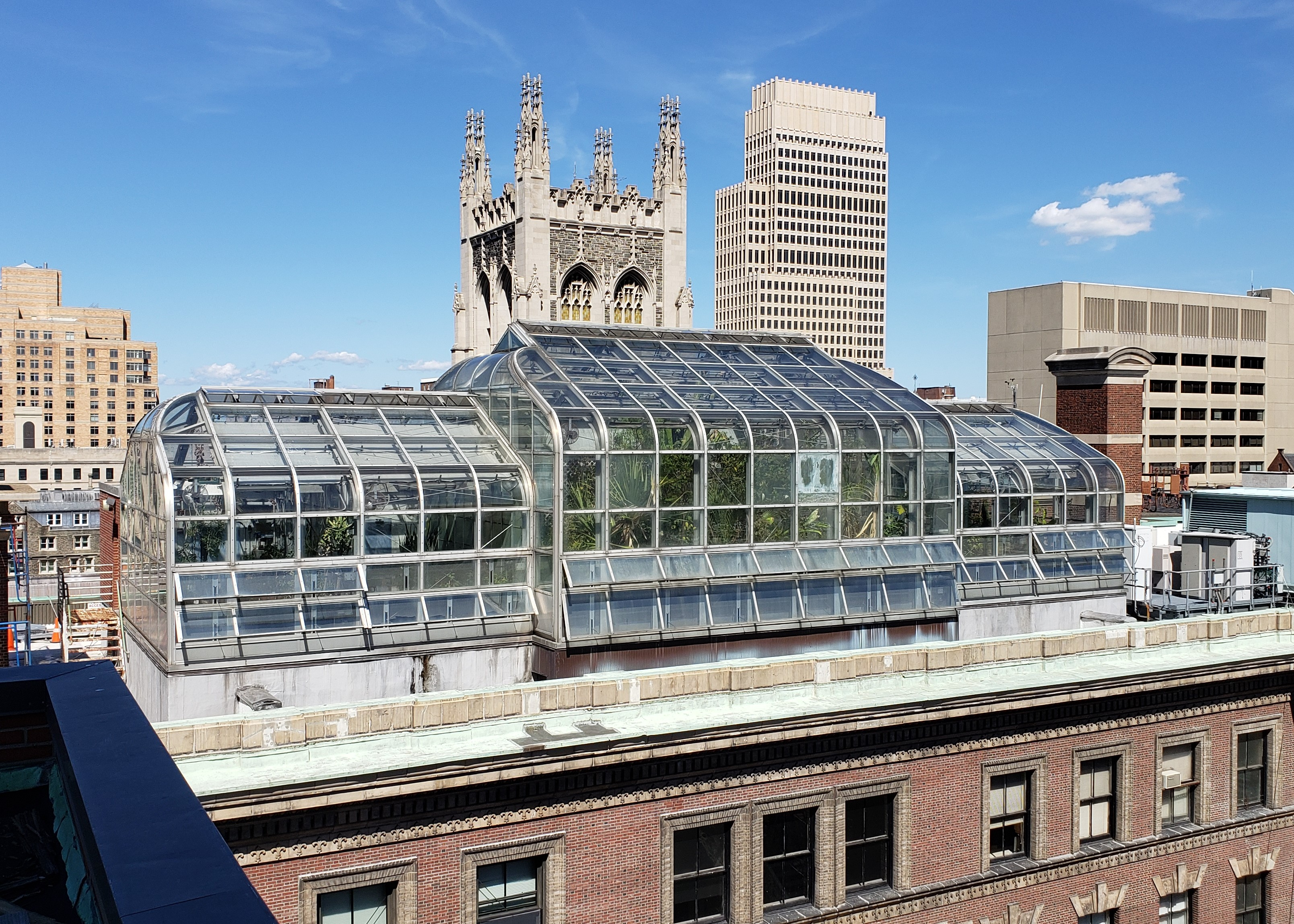
The Arthur Ross Greenhouse on the roof of Milbank Hall, 2020

The Arthur Ross Greenhouse is a greenhouse located on the rooftop of Milbank Hall at Barnard College, New York City. It is the third greenhouse to be built on the site since the College's founding, and houses a conservatory of approximately 650 plant species, as well as space for research in plant science and ecology.

== History ==
=== Origin ===
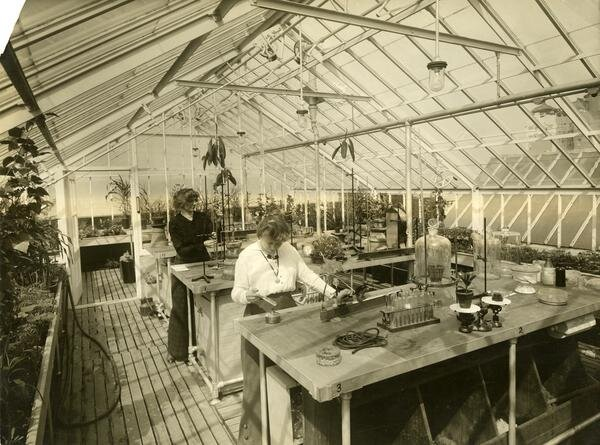
Students conducting experiments in the greenhouse, c. 1912

The rooftop location on which the current greenhouse stands was previously the site of two earlier greenhouses. Around 1912-13, the College’s first greenhouse was built on the contiguous rooftop of Fiske Hall. Later, in 1928, a second, larger greenhouse was constructed on the rooftop site in an effort to entice renowned professor Edmund Ware Sinnott to join the College’s faculty. Sinnott used the greenhouse to conduct his pioneering studies on squash genetics. After Sinnott left in 1940 to become the chair of the botany department at Yale University, it continued to be used for research and teaching by both faculty and students at Barnard, though over time it deteriorated and became energy-inefficient.

=== Construction ===
In 1996, trustee Arthur Ross donated $1 million to replace the Sinnott greenhouse with a new, state-of-the-art facility, which was completed and dedicated in 1998. The new greenhouse is computer-controlled, with automated temperature control, ventilation, solar shading, and watering. It occupies about 3,400 square feet of space, with a 24-foot-tall central conservatory, in addition to two smaller research bays on either side. Its taller, compartmentalized design and better temperature controls have allowed it to house both larger and more diverse plants than its predecessor, which was limited to a room-connected growing space for collecting tropical plants.

== Collection ==
In total, the greenhouse's collection includes roughly 650 different species, the majority of which are of tropical/subtropical origin. There is also an extensive collection of arid plants, as well as numerous mediterranean species. Among its notable specimens includes an A. titanum named Berani, which was gifted to Barnard by the Brooklyn Botanic Garden in 2013 and bloomed for the first time in 2020. Its nickname derives from the Indonesian word for brave.
