= Belvedere Castle =

Folly in New York City's Central Park

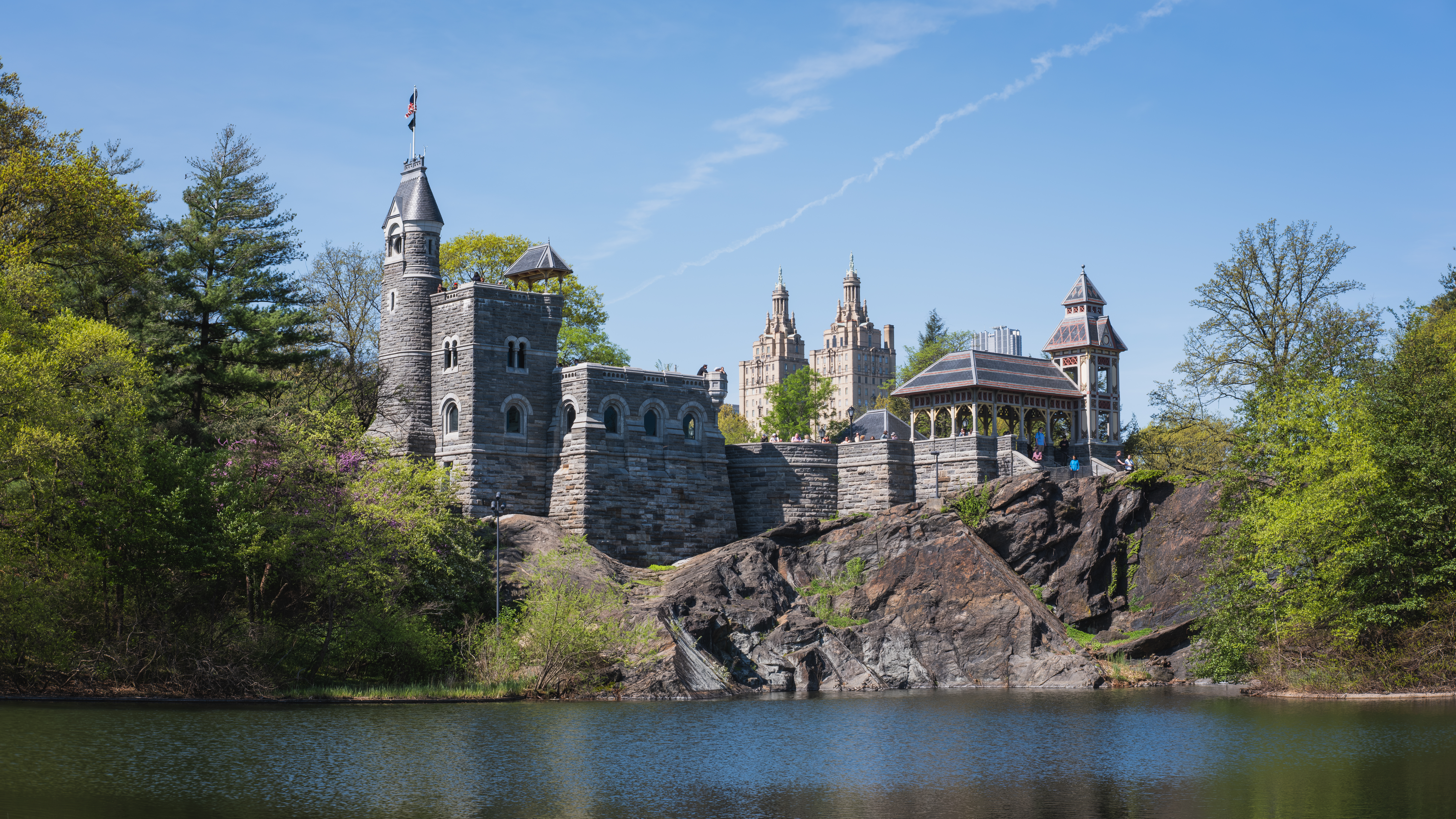

General information
- Architectural style: Hybrid of Gothic and Romanesque
- Coordinates: 40°46′46″N 73°58′09″W
- Construction started: 1867
- Completed: 1869

Design and construction
- Architects: Calvert Vaux and Jacob Wrey Mould

Belvedere Castle is a folly in Central Park in Manhattan, New York City. It contains exhibit rooms, an observation deck, and since 1919 has housed Central Park’s official weather station.

Belvedere Castle was designed by Calvert Vaux and Jacob Wrey Mould in 1867. An architectural hybrid of Romanesque and Gothic styles, the design called for a Manhattan schist and granite structure with a corner tower and conical cap, a lookout over parapet walls beneath it. Its name comes from belvedere, which means "beautiful view" in Italian.

== Design ==
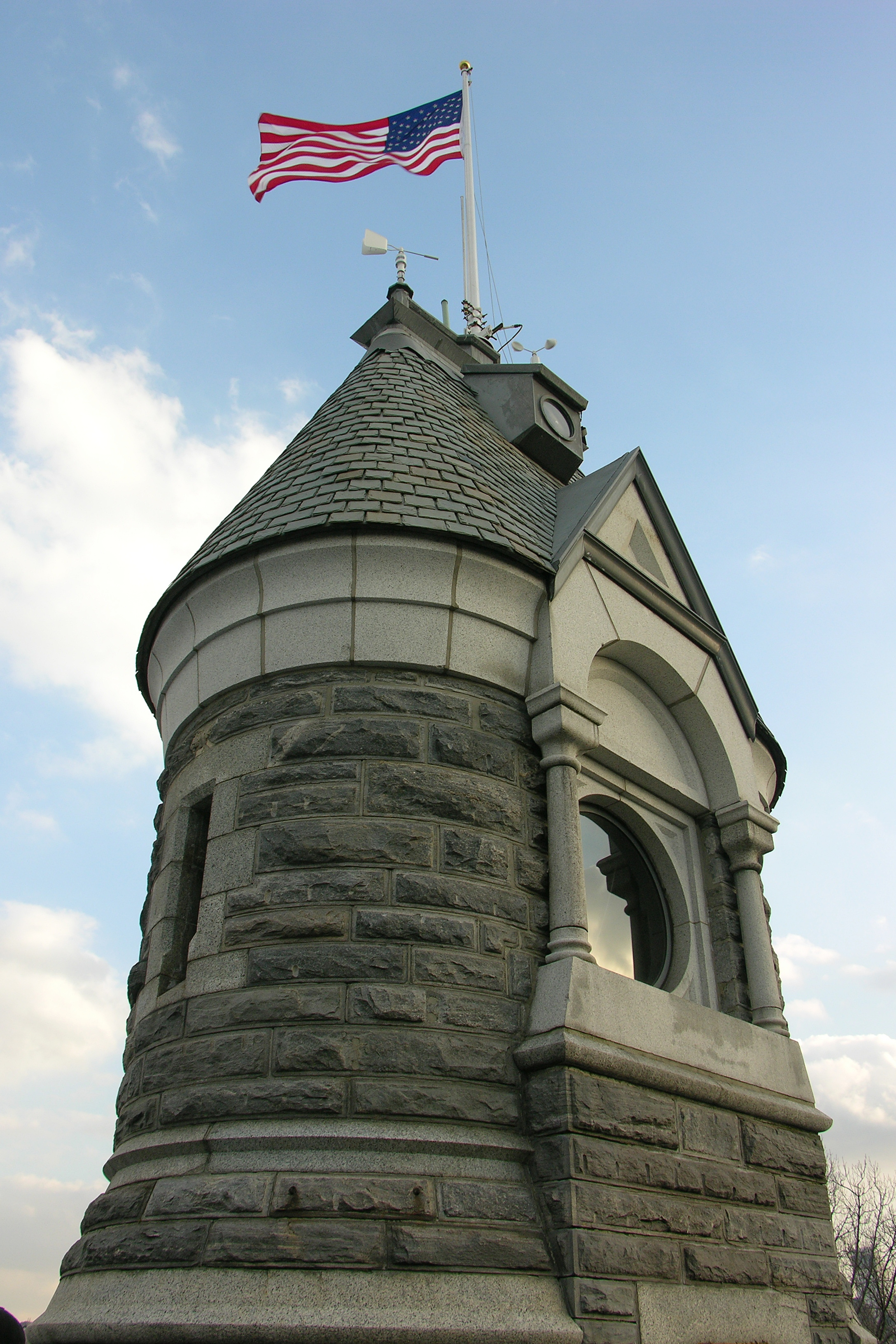
The tower in February 2005; note the anemometer and wind vane on the top; these instruments record the official wind speed and direction for Central Park

Belvedere Castle was built as a shell with doors and windows open to the weather. Originally, the main tower had a more medieval design, with a weather antenna on top, but during the castle's 1983 renovation, the tower was restored in a German style with a flag, a weather vane, and an anemometer on top. The two fanciful half-timbered wooden pavilions deteriorated without painting and upkeep and were removed before 1900, but restored in the 1980s.

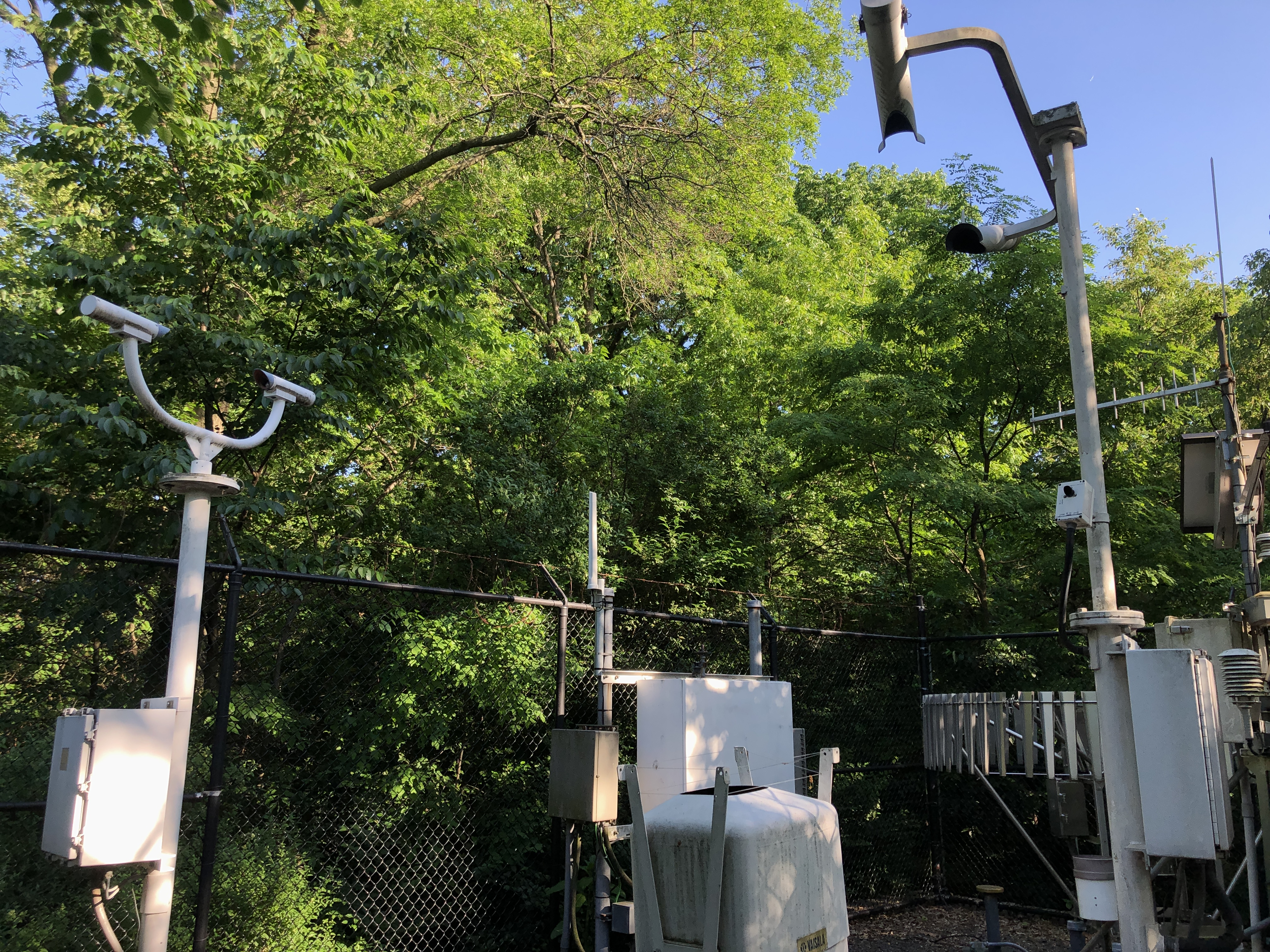
The remainder of the current weather station for Central Park is located in the wooded area immediately south of the castle, protected by a chain link fence topped with barbed wire

Starting in 1869, Belvedere Castle housed the New York Meteorological Observatory, which had been taken over by the United States Weather Bureau. The current weather station in Central Park, an Automated Surface Observing System (ASOS), is located immediately south of the castle, though wind equipment is still located on the main tower.

The castle caps Vista Rock, a 130-foot-tall (40 m) outcropping of schist and the park's second-highest natural elevation. (Summit Rock, at 83rd Street overlooking Central Park West, is higher at 137.5 feet (41.9 m).) Constructed of Manhattan schist quarried in the park and dressed with gray granite, it tops the natural-looking woodlands of The Ramble, as seen from the formal Bethesda Terrace. The natural rock was tunneled through for the innovative sunken transverse roadway that still carries commercial and other traffic unobtrusively through the park.

The castle serves now as a visitor center and gift shop. Free family and community programs hosted at Belvedere Castle include birding and other Central Park Conservancy discovery programs for families, as well as a variety of history and natural history programs led by NYC Urban Park Rangers, including stargazing/astronomy and wildlife-education events.

Belvedere Castle with a party going on.

The eastern elevation formerly faced a rectangular receiving reservoir that was part of the Croton Aqueduct system. The reservoir was filled in with city building rubble, beginning with spoil from construction of the New York City Subway's IND Eighth Avenue Line (now carrying the A, B, C, and D trains) in the 1930s. Today, the eastern elevation overlooks the Great Lawn and Turtle Pond, which occupies the former site of the receiving reservoir.

== History ==
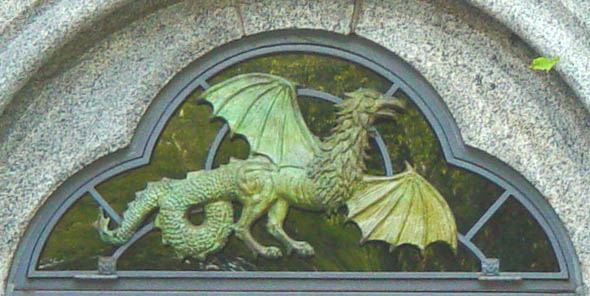
Mould's bronze cockatrice, part of a transom over a doorway of the Castle in 2004

The castle was designed by the architects Calvert Vaux and Jacob Wrey Mould as an additional feature of the Greensward Plan, created by Vaux and Frederick Law Olmsted. Olmsted and Vaux were re-hired to their positions in mid-1865 after quitting abruptly several years before. In 1867, Vaux decided to develop this area by building Belvedere Castle on the top of the rock, overlooking the Croton Reservoir. The site already held a fire tower under the control of the Croton Aqueduct board, and so the fire tower was demolished.

The original plans for Belvedere Castle called for two turreted stone towers: a larger structure on the eastern elevation and a smaller structure on the west side. Under Tammany Hall's leadership, it was revised in November 1870 to reduce costs and was completed as an open painted-wood pavilion of Mould's design. The eastern structure was completed by 1871, while the western structure was never built. As the plantings matured, the castle has been obscured from its original intended viewpoint. Its turret is the highest point in the park.

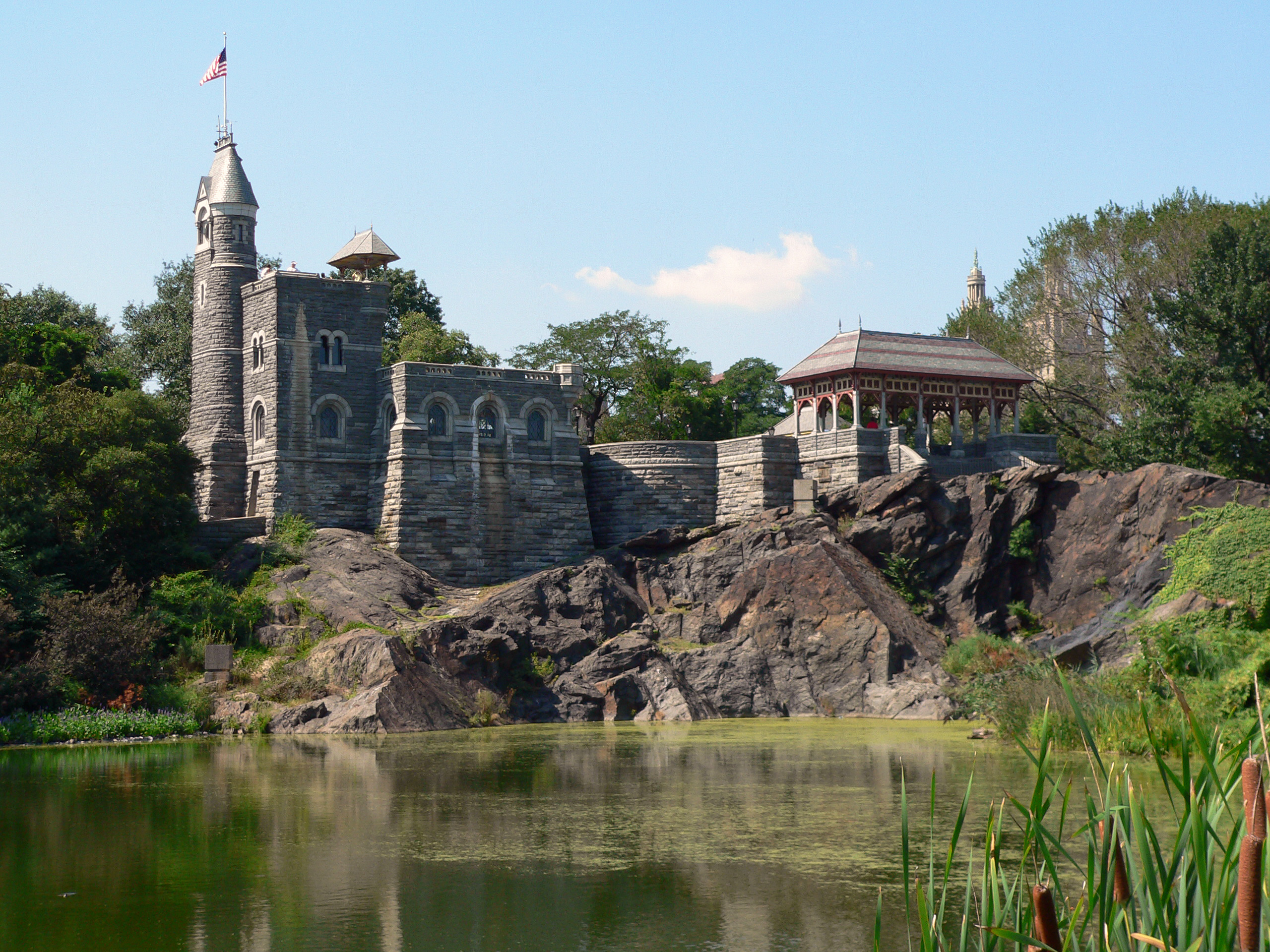
Belvedere Castle, Central Park

After the New York Meteorological Observatory automated its equipment and moved its offices to Rockefeller Center in the 1960s, Belvedere Castle was closed to the public and became an object of much vandalism, neglect and deterioration. The Central Park Conservancy launched a restoration effort and reopened the structure on May 1, 1983. The original turret was replaced, the pavilions were rebuilt, and the castle was converted into a visitor center. In 1995, the Conservancy's Historic Preservation Crew replaced the painted wooden loggia of the castle, working from the 1860s designs, on the granite piers and walls that had survived. The same year, a $340,000 grant was distributed toward restoring the castle as the Henry Luce Nature Center. That restoration was completed in 1996.

In 2018, the Central Park Conservancy conducted a second renovation of Belvedere Castle. Plans included replacing existing doors and windows with double paned glass. In addition the Conservancy proposed to construct a new access path to ADA standards from the East Drive. The access path − actually an elevated ramp with parapets − was criticized by some preservationists for jarring with the landscape and altering Olmstead's original naturalistic design of the paths. Following the $12 million renovation, the castle reopened on June 28, 2019, complete with a geothermal heating and cooling system that was installed by the Central Park Conservancy.
