= Great Lawn and Turtle Pond =

Geographical features in New York City's Central Park

Turtle Pond
- Belvedere Lake
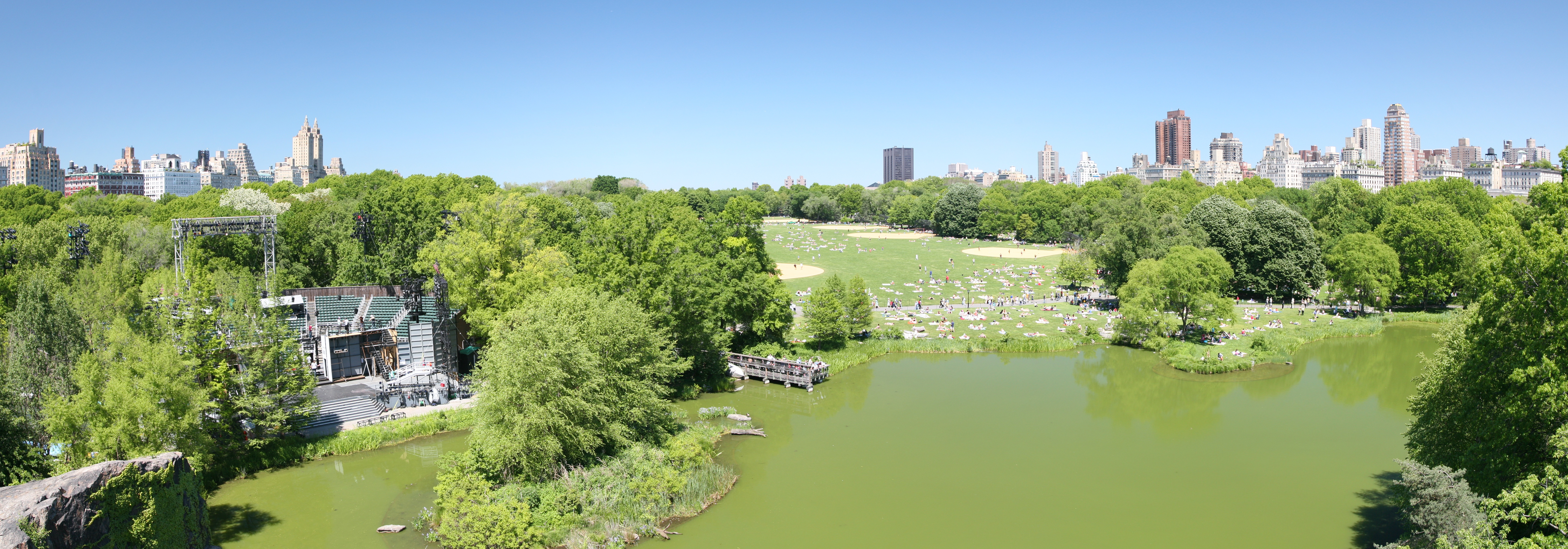
- Delacorte Theater, Turtle Pond, and the Great Lawn, from Belvedere Castle

- Location within Manhattan Location within New York City
- Interactive map of Turtle Pond
- Location: Central Park; Manhattan, New York City
- Coordinates: 40.7796°N 73.9679°W
- Type: Manmade pond
- Basin countries: United States
- Managing agency: Central Park Conservancy
- Built: 1937
- Construction engineer: Frederick Law Olmsted; Calvert Vaux
- Surface area: 2 acres (1 ha)
- Average depth: 12–24 in (30–61 cm)
- Surface elevation: 105 ft (32 m)
- Islands: 1
- Website: Website
- References: U.S. Geological Survey Geographic Names Information System: Turtle Pond

The Great Lawn and Turtle Pond are two connected features of Central Park in Manhattan, New York City, United States. The lawn and pond are located on the site of a former reservoir for the Croton Aqueduct system which was infilled during the early 20th century.

The pond, originally known as Belvedere Lake, abuts Belvedere Castle as well as the Delacorte Theater, and contains a variety of turtles and fish. The lawn is composed of 14 acres (5.7 ha) of oval-shaped land, which is used for sports and concerts.

== Description ==
Notable buildings and structures of Central Park. Click on the map and then on the points for details.

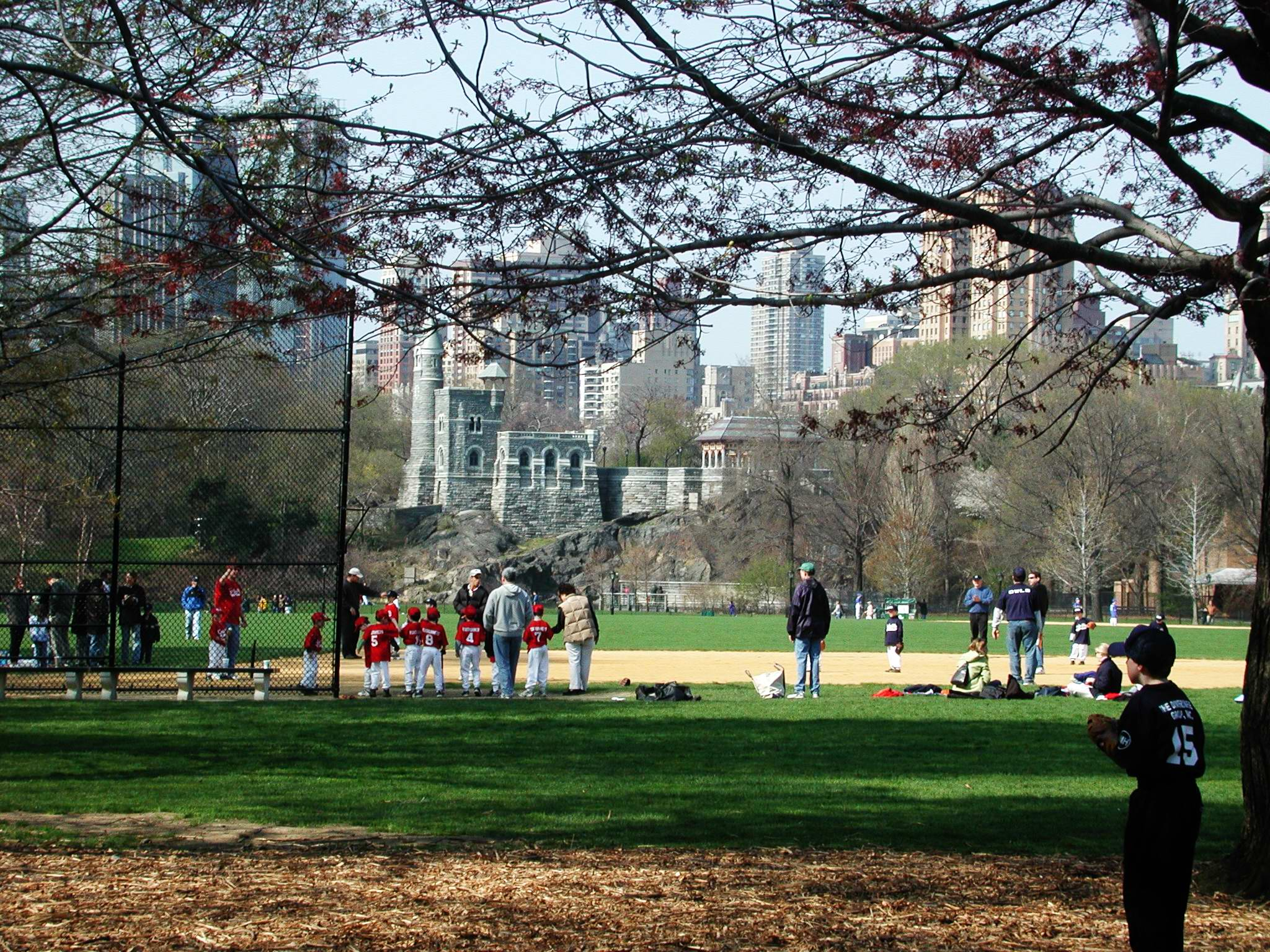
The Great Lawn

The lawn and pond occupy the almost flat site of the rectangular, 35-acre (14 ha) Lower Reservoir, which was incorporated into the Greensward Plan for Central Park, designed by Frederick Law Olmsted and Calvert Vaux. The King Jagiello Monument stands at Turtle Pond's east end, the Delacorte Theater on its west end. The Great Lawn proper, surrounded by an oval-shaped path, covers 14 acres (5.7 ha). The Turtle Pond and the adjacent Arthur Ross Pinetum occupy another 31 acres (13 ha). The Great Lawn and Turtle Pond take up about 55 acres (22 ha) in total.

=== Pond ===
The Turtle Pond is located south of the Lawn. Most of the park's turtles live in Turtle Pond, and many of these are former pets that were released into the park.

=== Lawn ===
The Great Lawn is mainly a recreational field, surrounded by an oval walkway. There are eight baseball fields on the Great Lawn (six within the oval walkway and two directly to the north), as well as a soccer field and four basketball courts.

=== Arthur Ross Pinetum ===
The Arthur Ross Pinetum, named after philanthropist Arthur Ross, contains 17 species of pine trees across a 4-acre (1.6 ha) area on the northwestern side of the oval.

== History ==
=== Site ===
The Yorkville Reservoir of the Croton Aqueduct system, also known as the Lower Reservoir or the receiving reservoir, was built in 1842 to store the city's drinking water. The community of York Hill was displaced for the creation of the reservoir, and the population moved to Seneca Village to the northwest, which itself was demolished when Central Park was constructed in the 1850s. The reservoir was filled to a depth of 34 feet (10 m) starting on June 27, 1842. The reservoir occupied the space between the 79th Street and 86th Street transverse roads, measuring 1,826 by 836 feet (557 by 255 m) with a capacity of at least 150 million U.S. gallons (570,000,000 L). The reservoir was surrounded by a stone retaining wall, a portion of which is still visible near the 86th Street transverse.

In Egbert Viele's plan for Central Park, whose rejection prompted the design competition of 1857-1858, the civil engineer "considered the reservoir worthy of attention as a major engineering feat, and his plan emphasized it by adding a terrace to the walls, from which spectators could observe military drills". Proponents of the naturalistic plans in the competition proposed "'planting out' the park boundaries and the 'ugly', 'artificial', 'uncouth', 'horrid', and 'discordant' distraction of the reservoirs in order to reinforce the sense of natural expanse". The southwestern corner of the reservoir was overlooked by Vista Rock, atop which Belvedere Castle was built in 1869. When Central Park was completed, the Lower Reservoir served as a complement to the Upper Reservoir, now the Jacqueline Kennedy Onassis Reservoir.

=== Design ===
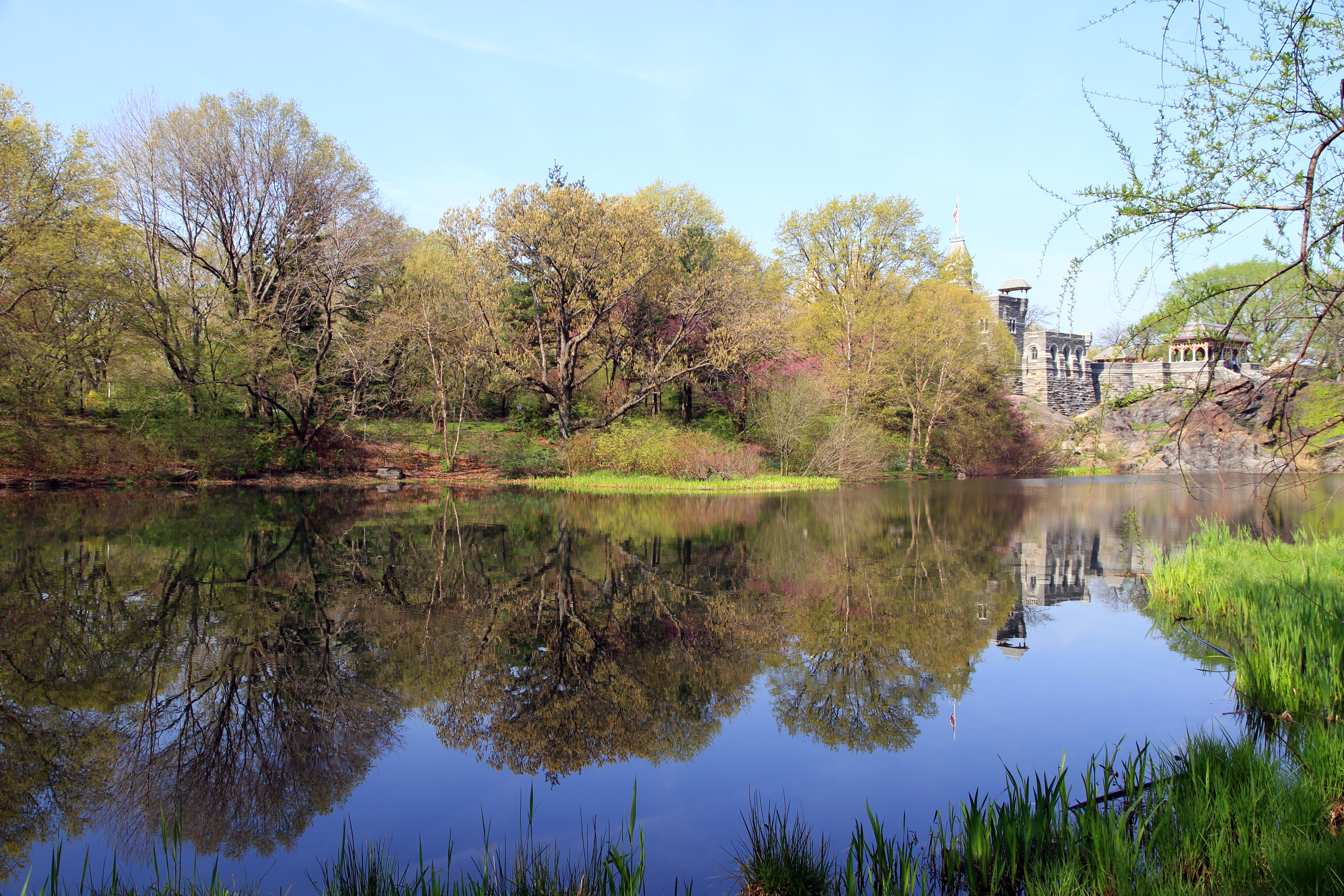
Reflections in the water at Turtle Pond

As the Croton-Catskill Reservoir system was completed in the first decade of the 20th century, the Lower Reservoir came to be redundant. As early as 1903, there were plans to cover the reservoir to create additional recreational space, and in 1910, park commissioner Charles Bunstein Stover started advocating for the removal of the reservoir. In spite of years of prodding, the commissioners of the Catskill Aqueduct were loath to hand over their real estate to the city.

A number of projects in the City Beautiful manner were suggested for the site. This was epitomized by the Catskill Aqueduct Celebration Committee's commission of a design from the prominent Beaux-Arts "society" architect Thomas Hastings. (Note: His plan would have provided a grand formal space like a partly flooded version of the Paris Trocadéro, featuring a bronze casting of Frederick MacMonnies' Columbia in the Ship of State, the familiar fountain centerpiece of the lagoon at the 1893 World's Columbian Exposition of Chicago.) Henry Fairfield Osborn lobbied instead for a formal carriage drive that would link his American Museum of Natural History with the Metropolitan Museum of Art. Other plans for the site called for airplane landing pads, an opera house, a radio tower, sports arenas, underground parking. and a film-storage mausoleum.

These plans were decried as intrusions by park preservationists protecting the Olmstedian rustic plan on the one hand, and as elitist by populist champions of organized recreation facilities, who envisaged playing fields and bath houses for the city's urban poor. The city approved Hastings's plan in 1917. However, with the growing intensity of World War I, Central Park cycled through five parks commissioners between November 1917 and February 1918, and Hastings's plan was dropped by the administration of mayor John Francis Hylan.

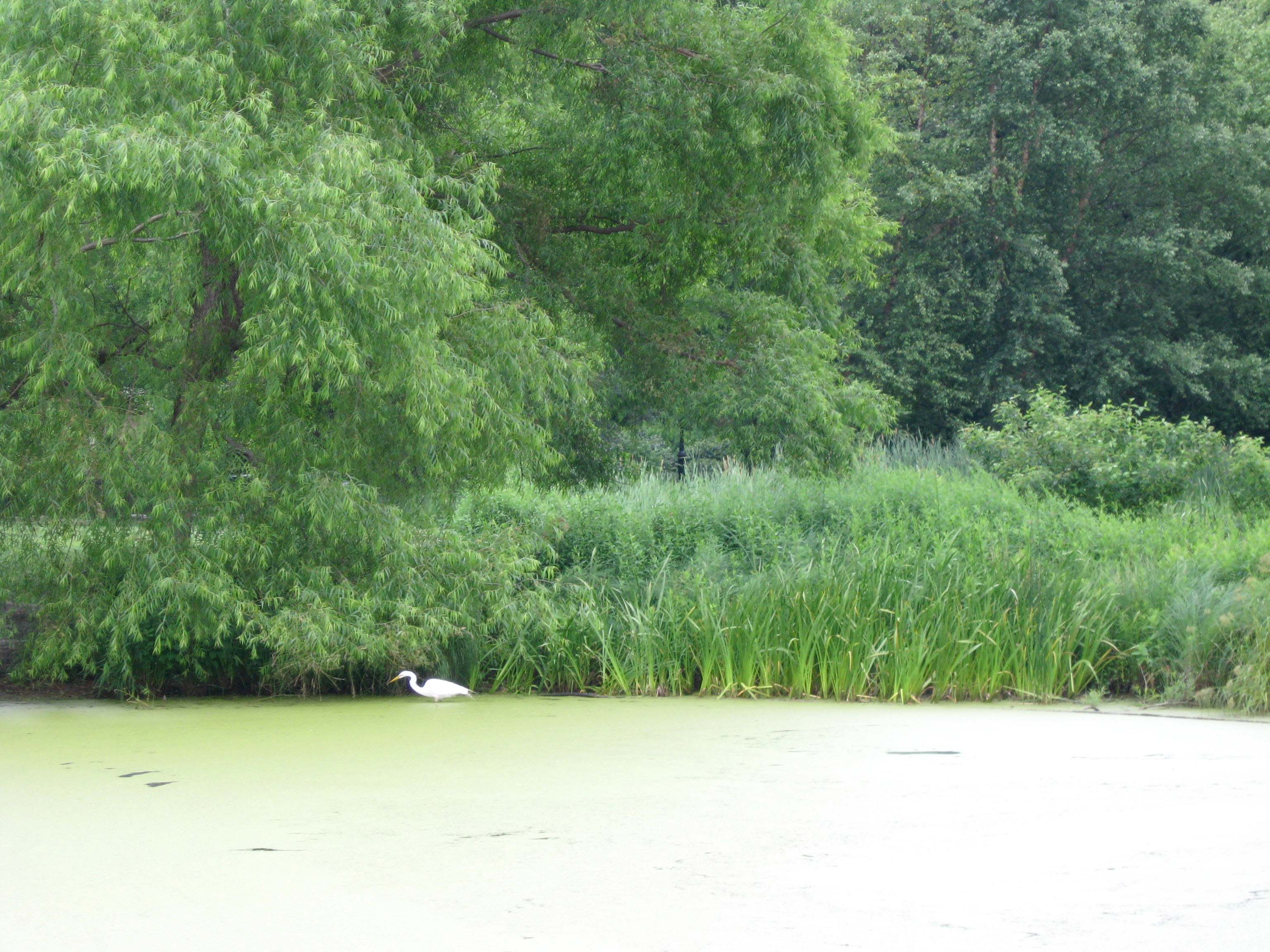
Snowy egret in Turtle Pond

In 1922, Hastings recast his plan as a recreational center and memorial to the soldiers of World War I, which fulfilled both the City Beautiful and recreational demands for the reservoir site. By the mid-1920s, populist groups and newspapers were publicly calling for expansion of recreational space. Notably, the New York Daily News published a series of articles advocating for different reuses of the receiving reservoir. The issue became politicized. Hastings's World War I monument proposal, increasingly tied to Hylan's policies, was criticized by many of Hylan's opponents, and lost even more support when Hylan proposed a performing arts center on the site. Hastings stated that the space would be wasted if the memorial plan were to be dropped, and in 1925 the city's Board of Estimate gave preliminary approval to the memorial.

The Central Park Association, one of several groups to advocate for the improvement of Central Park, was created in December 1925. They opposed the memorial and subsequently succeeded in reversing the city's endorsement of the memorial. Simultaneously, during the land boom that filled Fifth Avenue and Central Park West with luxury apartment towers for the rich. the Fifth Avenue Association was created. That association also opposed a reservoir memorial because it was seen as contributory to the decline of Central Park.

A third group, the Citizens Union, endorsed the city's proposal to fill in the receiving reservoir. In the meantime, Frederick Law Olmsted's son Frederick Olmsted Jr. worked with Harvard librarian Theodora Kimball Hubbard to compile Frederick Sr.'s papers. The resulting publication invigorated preservationists who wanted to see the reservoir redeveloped as a more natural area. This, combined with mayor Jimmy Walker's increases to park budgets, resulted in a small general cleanup of Central Park, but also saw the cancellation of the memorial.

=== Construction and opening ===
The reservoir began to be drained in January 1930. The project required the dumping of 1,000,000 cubic yards (760,000 m^{3}) of dirt into the decommissioned reservoir, which was set to be completed within a year. That April the American Society of Landscape Architects, New York Chapter (ASLA) proposed a sunken meadow and lake within the former reservoir site. In June 1930 the city adopted a plan presented by the ASLA for a great oval of turf, its edges softened by trees planted in clumps within and outside the encircling pedestrian walkway.

Two fenced playgrounds at the northern end (Note: The northwestern playground was replanned as the Arthur Ross Pinetum in 1971; the northeastern playground is reconfigured for handball and basketball.) were to be screened by shrubs and trees. The drainage was collected in a small receiving reservoir at the south end, the predecessor of the present Turtle Pond, which revealed its essentially rectangular shape, in spite of mild waggles in its concrete curbing. Along its southern shore, the steep gradient that had impounded the reservoir was regraded and planted with trees and shrubs to mask its regularity. The former receiving reservoir was filled in with dirt from the construction of Rockefeller Center.

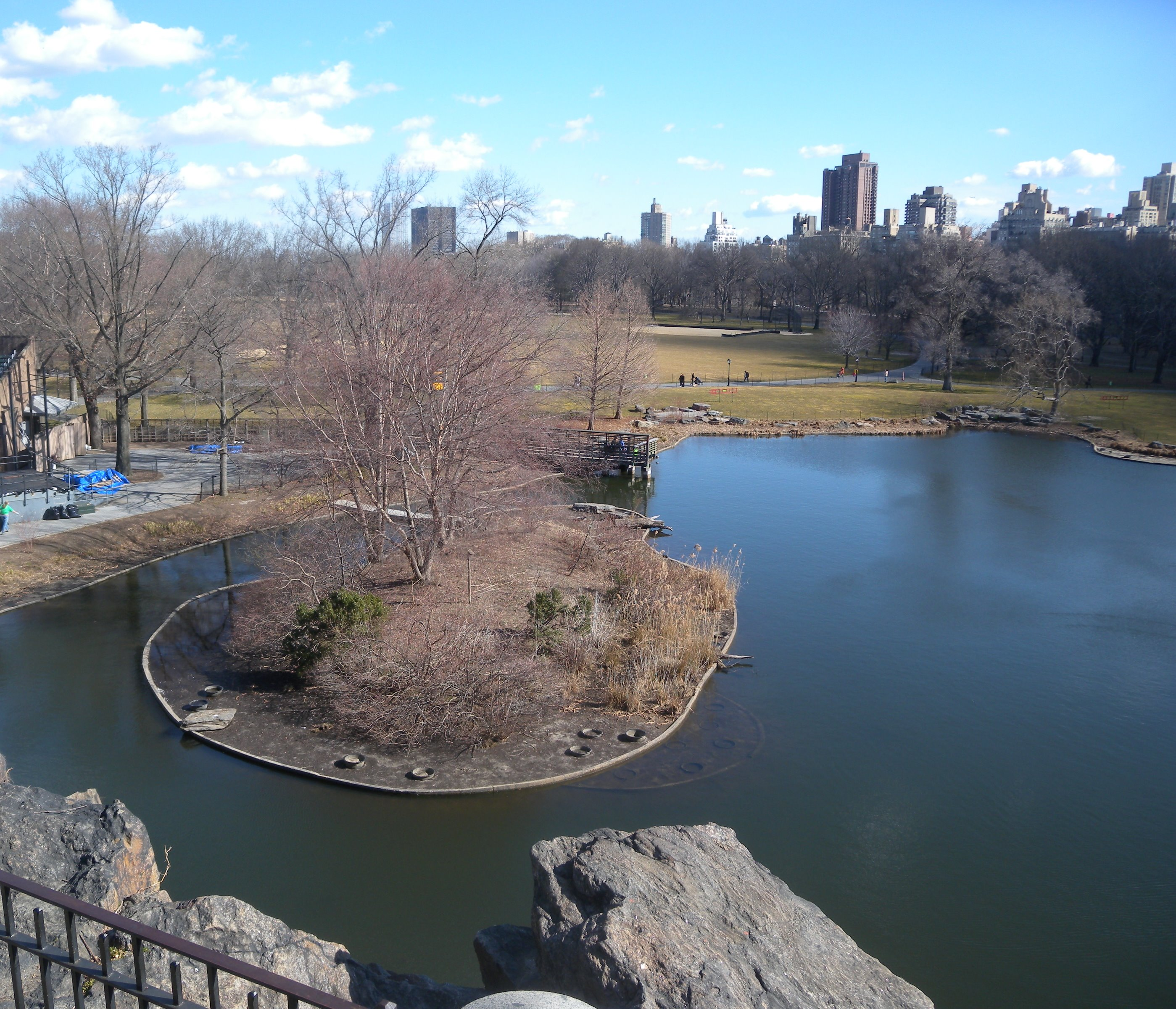
Island in Turtle Pond

In the meantime, the city teetered on the edge of insolvency during the Great Depression. A "Hooverville" of improvised shacks developed in the dry bed of the reservoir, as the city began dumping fill. The homeless were initially evicted when they tried to move into the site in late 1930, but public sentiment gradually turned to sympathy. The few dozen shacks on the site were allowed to stay through April 1933, when they were evicted.

Following the destruction of the Hoovertown, parks commissioner John E. Sheehy proposed building running tracks and ball fields on the site of the reservoir. The plan was controversial. It was strongly opposed by preservationists and advocacy groups, who argued that these would ruin the rural character of Central Park as originally envisioned by Olmsted and Vaux. The Daily News, on the other hand, supported Sheehy's plan and denounced the objections as classist discrimination, since the opponents of the Sheehy plan were mainly wealthy residents of nearby areas. Sheehy's successor Robert Moses, who would see the ASLA Great Lawn to completion, took office with mayor Fiorello La Guardia in January 1934. Moses replaced Sheehy's plan with his own, which placed large playgrounds and children's recreational facilities on the perimeter of a proposed meadow.

The Great Lawn was essentially completed in 1937. It was planted with pine oaks and European lindens, in the reduced range of trees in the current repertory. With the installation of children's play structures, the Great Lawn became a children's play area, contrasting with the adults' play area in North Woods and North Meadow.

=== Degradation and restoration ===
The Great Lawn received its baseball diamonds in the 1950s. Heavy use followed, and by the 1970s, the Great Lawn had badly compacted soil. Advocates argue this compaction was aggravated by its use for outdoor concerts once the Sheep Meadow had been restored in 1979. Eroded topsoil that washed into Belvedere Lake resulted in eutrophication that turned it to algal soup each summer. After Belvedere Castle was renovated in the 1980s, marshes were placed on the northern bank of Belvedere Lake, and turtles were introduced there.

In 1987, the Central Park Conservancy proposed renovating Belvedere Lake. This was stymied by the presence of dragonflies in the lake, and the project was later postponed. Belvedere Lake was officially renamed Turtle Pond the same year. In October 1995, the Conservancy took up the joint project of rehabilitating fifty-five acres of the lawn and its surroundings. The resodding of the Great Lawn commenced in October 1996, at which point officials replaced a 15-acre (6.1 ha) ovoid patch of the Lawn, and nearby areas, with new sod for $18 million. The project was completed the following year. The renovation included the installation of 250 automatic water sprinklers and 2,000 new trees, as well as a nature blind to observe the area's wildlife.

The Conservancy also completely drained, re-excavated, and reconfigured Turtle Pond. The project, completed in 1997, was designed so that at no position can a viewer take in all its perimeter. Shoreline plants such as lizard's tail, bulrushes, turtlehead (Chelone glabra), and blueflag iris were planted in submerged concrete shelving designed to offer each group of wetland plants their ideal water coverage. A small island provides sunning spots and secure egg-laying sites for the turtles. Sightings of numerous species of dragon fly not previously noted in Central Park have been made.

== Use ==
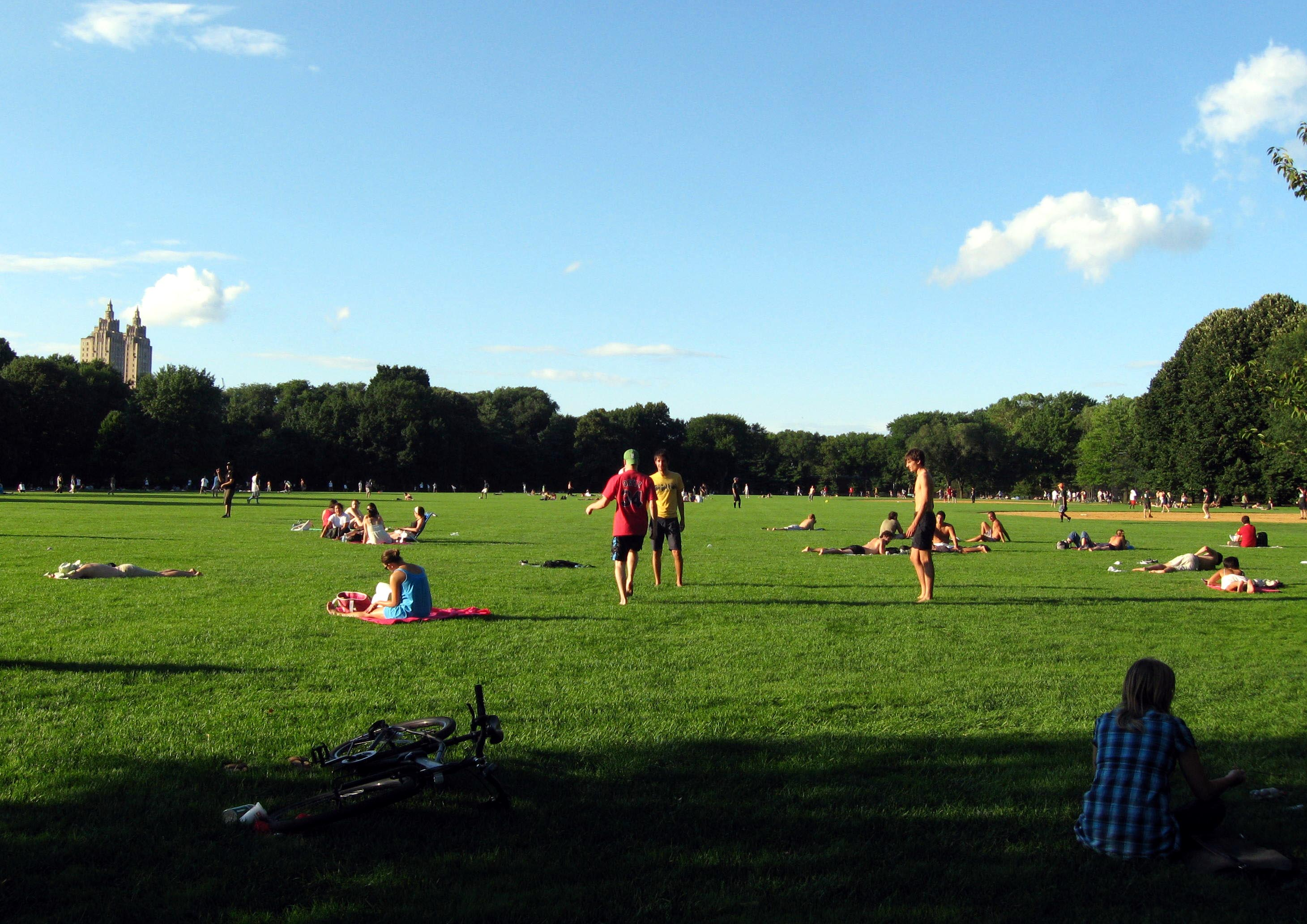
Recreational usage of the Great Lawn

In 1996, Great Lawn was used by 12,100 softball games per year, with 250,000 combined players. The following year, it was estimated that 15 million people crossed the Great Lawn every year.

=== Concerts ===
Annual concerts by the Metropolitan Opera and the New York Philharmonic started in the 1960s. (Note: See, for example: Strongin, Theodore (August 18, 1965). "CONCERT IN PARK HEARD BY 73,500; Ozawa Leads Philharmonic in the Sheep Meadow". The New York Times. ISSN 0362-4331.; Wilson, John S. (June 18, 1967). "Barbra Streisand's Free Sing-In Jams Sheep Meadow in the Park; Barbra Streisand's, Sing-In Jams Sheep Meadow". The New York Times. ISSN 0362-4331.) Several past concerts have supposedly drawn hundreds of thousands of spectators each. The 1980 Elton John concert drew 300,000 attendees, the 1981 Simon and Garfunkel reunion concert more than 500,000, and the 1982 Anti-Nuclear Rally nearly 750,000. Other large concerts include Paul Simon's 1991 concert, which drew 600,000 fans to the Great Lawn, In September 2003, Dave Matthews Band recorded the live album Central Park Concert at the Lawn, and drew more than 120,000 fans, and Bon Jovi's concert during the 2008 MLB All-Star Weekend, which drew about 50,000 people.

Other events held in the Great Lawn included the New York opening of the Disney movie Pocahontas in June 1995, and Pope John Paul II's open-air mass for 125,000 that October. Until the later-canceled OZY Fest in July 2019, most of the Great Lawn's concerts were free to attend. OZY Fest's plans to charge admission on half of the 40,000 tickets was controversial, even though the remaining tickets would be free, because it would require closing off the Great Lawn for nine days in the middle of the summer.

Park officials have been skeptical of the claim that hundreds of thousands of people could fit in the Great Lawn, since Bon Jovi's concert in 2008 which filled the lawn. Only about 10 acres (4.0 ha) of the lawn are estimated to be usable during concerts, and about 6,000 to 8,000 people could fit in an average acre if each person had 5 to 7 square feet (0.46 to 0.65 m^{2}) of personal space.

During the 2004 Republican National Convention, NYC Parks denied protesters the right to organize in either the Great Lawn or North Meadow, citing concerns over possible damage to the turf. In 2005, NYC Parks proposed setting a capacity limit on the Great Lawn to 50,000 people. Many groups and people objected to the proposed regulation, saying that it violated their right to congregate under the First Amendment to the United States Constitution. The proposal was withdrawn in 2008. However, an independent report the following year recommended a 55,000-person capacity for the Great Lawn, implicitly supporting NYC Parks' initial proposal.
