= Edmund Ware Sinnott =

American botanist and educator

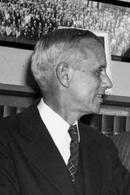
- Sinnott in 1947.
- Born: February 5, 1888; Cambridge, Massachusetts, United States
- Died: January 6, 1968 (aged 79); New Haven, Connecticut, United States
- Education: Harvard University
- Occupations: Botanist; Educator
- Scientific career
- Author abbrev. (botany): Sinnott

Edmund Ware Sinnott (February 5, 1888–January 6, 1968) was an American botanist and educator. Sinnott is best known for his work in plant morphology.

== Career ==
Sinnott received his Bachelor of Arts (1908), Master of Arts (1910), and Doctor of Philosophy (1913), all from Harvard University. During his freshman year of college, he lived in Stoughton Hall. Sinnott studied in Australia with Arthur Johnson Eames from 1910 to 1911. Upon graduation, he became an instructor at Harvard, and worked with I. W. Bailey, the anatomist. From 1915 to 1928, he was at the Connecticut Agricultural College at Storrs, becoming Professor of Botany and Genetics. From 1928 to 1939, he was Professor of Botany at Barnard College, where he helped refurbish the Arthur Ross Greenhouse, and chair of the Botany Department at Columbia University (1939-1940). In 1940, he moved to Yale University to become Sterling Professor of Botany, chair of the Botany Department (1940-1956), director of the Marsh Botanical Garden (1940-1950), dean of the Graduate School (1950-1956) and director of Sheffield Scientific School (1945-1956).

He was also made editor of the American Journal of Botany, member of the American Academy of Arts and Sciences, member of the National Academy of Sciences, member of the American Philosophical Society, and president of the Botanical Society of America, the American Society of Naturalists and the American Association for the Advancement of Science.

He was the co-author of the textbook Principles of Genetics (1925) which received positive reviews.

Throughout his life, Sinnott was a prolific author; he wrote ninety scientific articles and many textbooks. Sinnott contributed to the field of Colonial and early American Architecture with his book Meetinghouse & Church in Early New England (1963), with photographs by Jerauld Manter.

In his teaching, Sinnott stressed the idea of scientific discovery and the importance of making careful measurements and correctly interpreting data. He endeavored to explain the organism as an integrated whole from the sum of its parts, processes and history.

He retired in 1956 and died in New Haven in 1968.

== Philosophy ==
Sinnott was a proponent of organicism and a critic of reductionism. He held that view that life is goal directed and purposive.

In his book Biology of Spirit (1955) he used the term Telism which he defined as "the philosophy of goals-a belief that what is important is not the push and drive of a living system but the drawing power of a goal, conscious or unconscious, that in some is established in it". His philosophy was compared by critics to a form of vitalism. Others such as George Gaylord Simpson claimed Sinnott was promoting a theological version of orthogenesis.

He rejected both dualism and materialistic monism for his own philosophy which was described by a reviewer as idealistic monism. He argued for the existence of an impersonal God which he described as a purposive organizing agent. He was criticized by Leo Koch for making metaphysical statements in his science books, he stated for example "The Principle of Organization is far more than a scientific concept. It states a belief that there is operating in the universe a something that leads to spirit; something that is spirit."

In his book Cell and Psyche (1950) he argued that mind and matter are two aspects of the same phenomenon and that purpose exists in all organisms as it is built into the genotype and the protoplasm.

== Publications ==
- Botany, Principles and Problems (1923, sixth edition in 1963)
- Principles of Genetics (1925, third edition in 1934)
- Laboratory Manual for Elementary Botany (1927)
- Cell and Psyche (1950)
- Two Roads to Truth (1953)
- The Biology of the Spirit (1955)
- Life and Mind (1956)
- Matter, Mind, and Man (1957)
- Plant Morphogenesis (1960)
- The Bridge of Life: From Matter to Spirit (1966)
