= Central Park Conservancy =

American nonprofit conservancy

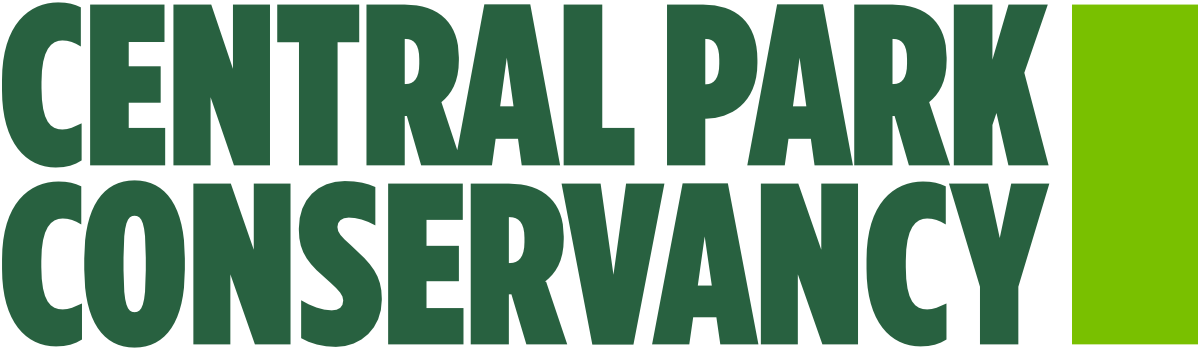
- Predecessor: Central Park Task Force, Central Park Community Fund
- Founded: 1980
- Founders: Elizabeth Barlow Rogers, William Sperry Beinecke, Ed Koch, Gordon Davis, Andrew Stein (ex officio)
- Tax ID no.: 13-3022855
- Location: New York City, U.S.
- Coordinates: 40°46′56″N 73°57′55″W
- Region served: Central Park
- Key people: Elizabeth W. Smith (President & CEO)
- Website: centralparknyc.org

The Central Park Conservancy is an American private, nonprofit park conservancy that manages New York City's Central Park under a contract with the government of New York City and NYC Parks. The conservancy employs most maintenance and operations staff in the park. It effectively oversees the work of both the private and public employees under the authority of the publicly appointed Central Park administrator, who reports to the parks commissioner and the conservancy's president.

The Central Park Conservancy was founded in 1980 in the aftermath of Central Park's decline in the 1960s and 1970s. Initially devoted to fundraising for projects to restore and improve the park, it took over the park's management duties in 1998. The organization has overseen the investment of more than $1 billion toward the restoration and enhancement of Central Park since its founding. With an endowment of over $200 million, consisting of contributions from residents, corporations, and foundations, the Conservancy raises the Park’s nearly $74 million annual operating budget and is responsible for all basic care of the park. The Conservancy also provides maintenance support and staff training programs for other public parks in New York City, and has assisted with the development of new parks, such as the High Line and Brooklyn Bridge Park.

== History ==
Notable buildings and structures of Central Park. Click on the map and then on the points for details.

=== Creation ===
The Conservancy was born out of community concern during the park's rapid decline in the 1960s and 1970s. The 1975 New York City fiscal crisis left Central Park a virtually abandoned dustbowl that residents came to view as a dangerous, crime-ridden space. Many advocacy groups had been working separately to improve conditions in Central Park. This included the Central Park Task Force, formed in 1975 and led by Elizabeth Barlow Rogers, an urban planner, writer and civic activist.

In late 1974, Columbia University Professor E.S. Savas published a report, which concluded that the park needed one unpaid individual employed by the New York City Department of Parks and Recreation (NYC Parks) to oversee its daily operations. It also recommended the establishment of a private, citizen-based board that would advise the overseeing individuals, as well as the creation of the Central Park Community Fund. The Fund was subsequently founded by Richard Gilder and George Soros. The suggestions of the Savas report were also supported by Mayor Edward I. Koch's Parks Commissioner Gordon Davis, and in 1979 the city established the Office of Central Park Administrator and appointed Barlow as the first Central Park Administrator.

On December 13, 1980, the Central Park Task Force and the Central Park Community Fund joined to form the not-for-profit Central Park Conservancy, a public–private partnership created to bring private resources to the public Park. According to commissioner Davis, this was due to a need for "something permanent and nonpolitical, not subject to changes when a commissioner or mayor leaves office; but also something that was accountable to the public and that worked in partnership with the city." Mayor Ed Koch selected philanthropist William Sperry Beinecke as the inaugural chair of the board of the Central Park Conservancy, and Beinecke in turn selected the board's roughly thirty private citizens. Beinecke also named a 44-person "Founders Committee" composed of individuals who had supported Central Park, such as Brooke Astor, George T. Delacorte Jr., Lucy Moses, Paul Newman, and Jacqueline Kennedy Onassis. The Conservancy included four working committees: the Program and Planning Committee, the Development Committee, the Nominating Committee, and the Audit Committee.

=== 1980s renovations ===
The Great Lawn before renovations in the late 1970s.

The Great Lawn after renovations in the 1980s.

Under the leadership of the Central Park Conservancy, the park's reclamation began by addressing needs that could not be met within NYC Parks' existing resources. The Conservancy hired interns and a small restoration staff to reconstruct and repair unique rustic features, undertaking horticultural projects, and removing graffiti under the broken windows theory, which advocated removing visible signs of decay. According to Conservancy president Douglas Blonsky:

Graffiti doesn't last 24 hours in Central Park; visible litter gets carted off by 9 each morning and throughout the day. Our workers empty trash receptacles daily (at least) and maintain lawns with tremendous care. Broken benches and playground equipment get fixed on the spot.

The first structure to be renovated was the Dairy, which was rehabilitated and reopened as the park's first visitor center in 1979. The Sheep Meadow, which reopened the following year, was the first landscape to be restored. By then, the Conservancy was engaged in design efforts and long-term restoration planning, and it hired Pamela Tice as its CEO in 1981. Some projects were already underway or complete. Bethesda Fountain, which had been dry for decades, was restored in 1981; the USS Maine National Monument and the Bow Bridge had also already been restored. In its first annual financial report, for the two fiscal years ending June 30, 1982, the Conservancy reported $2 million in endowments, most of which came from donors who donated at least $1,000 each.

At the end of 1981, Davis and Barlow announced a 10-year, $100 million "Central Park Management and Restoration Plan", under which all future renovations would proceed. The first project to be undertaken as part of the restoration plan was the renovation of Bethesda Terrace, which started in 1982. The long-closed Belvedere Castle was renovated and reopened in 1983, winning a renovation award from the New York City Landmarks Preservation Commission, which had previously designated the park as a scenic landmark. The renovation of Central Park also entailed the examination of thousands of plants, as well as the mapping and construction of new paths along heavily trafficked grass routes. In conjunction with this renovation, the Strawberry Fields memorial to the murdered musician John Lennon was built in the western end of the park, and the Dene Rustic Shelter was restored.

The Conservancy started two fundraising initiatives in fiscal year 1983: the Olmsted Awards Luncheon and "You Gotta Have Park Weekend". On completion of the planning stage in 1985, the conservancy launched its first capital campaign, assuming increasing responsibility for funding the park's restoration, and full responsibility for designing, bidding, and supervising all capital projects in the park. The Conservancy developed a 15-year restoration plan that sought to remain true to the original design while supporting current goals of use.

Over the next several years, the campaign restored landmarks in the southern part of the park, such as Grand Army Plaza and the police station at the 86th Street transverse. In the northern end of the park, the Conservancy restored the Conservatory Garden as designed by the landscape architect Lynden Miller. It reopened in 1987. By 1988, the Conservancy was raising $6 million in donations annually. However, the Conservancy still faced obstacles, including opposition to projects such as the reconstruction of the Mall's bandshell and the erection of the North Meadow Recreation Center.

While most of the park's restorations in the 1980s were Conservancy projects, two major attractions were restored by other entities. Real estate developer Donald Trump took over management of the Wollman Rink in 1987 and renovated it after prior renovation plans were repeatedly delayed. The New York Zoological Society, which signed an agreement with the city to take over management of the Central Park Zoo in 1980, closed the zoo in 1983 for renovation. It reopened four years later, after a $35 million renovation.

=== 1990s renovations ===
Central Park after renovations

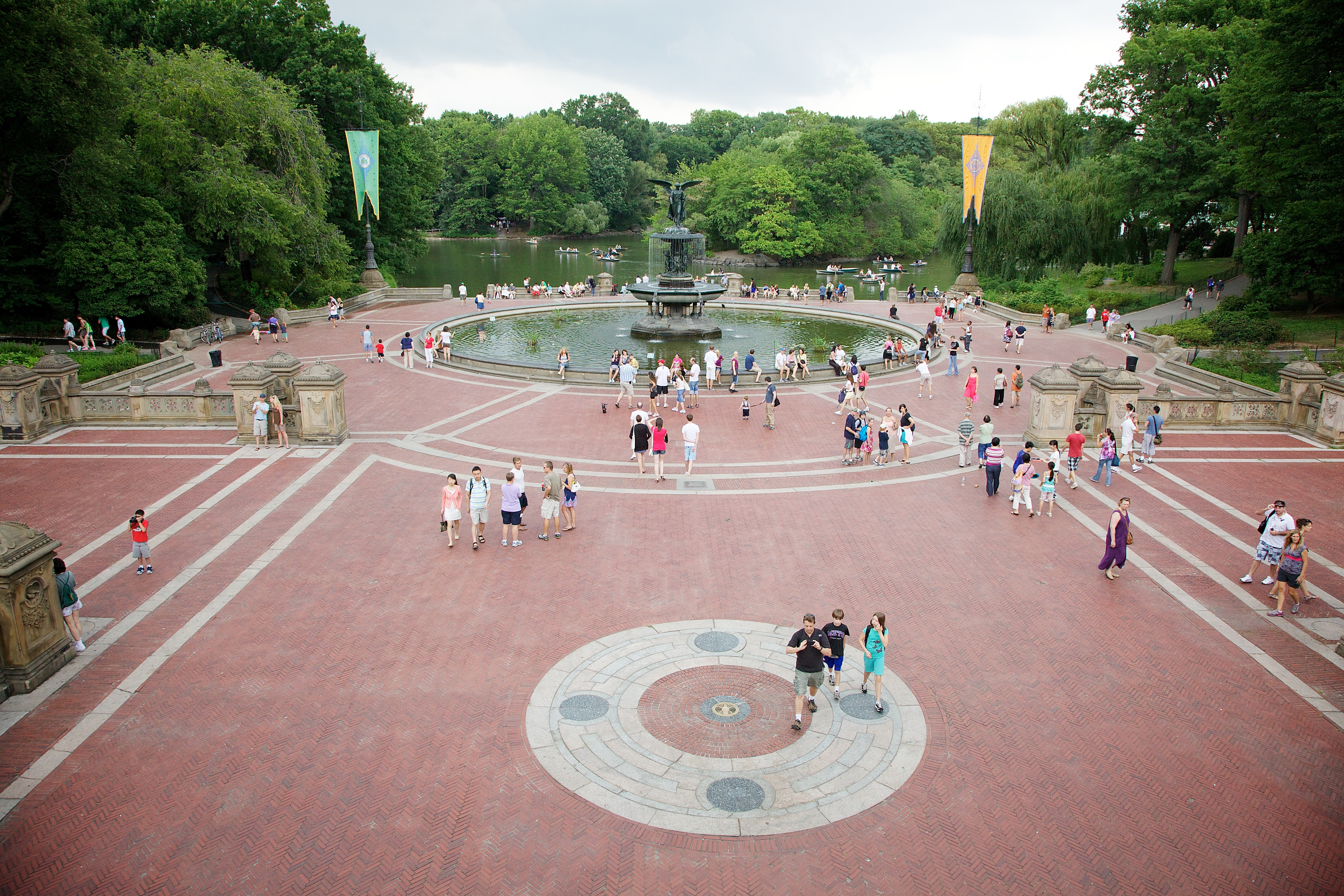
Renovated Bethesda Fountain Plaza in 2010

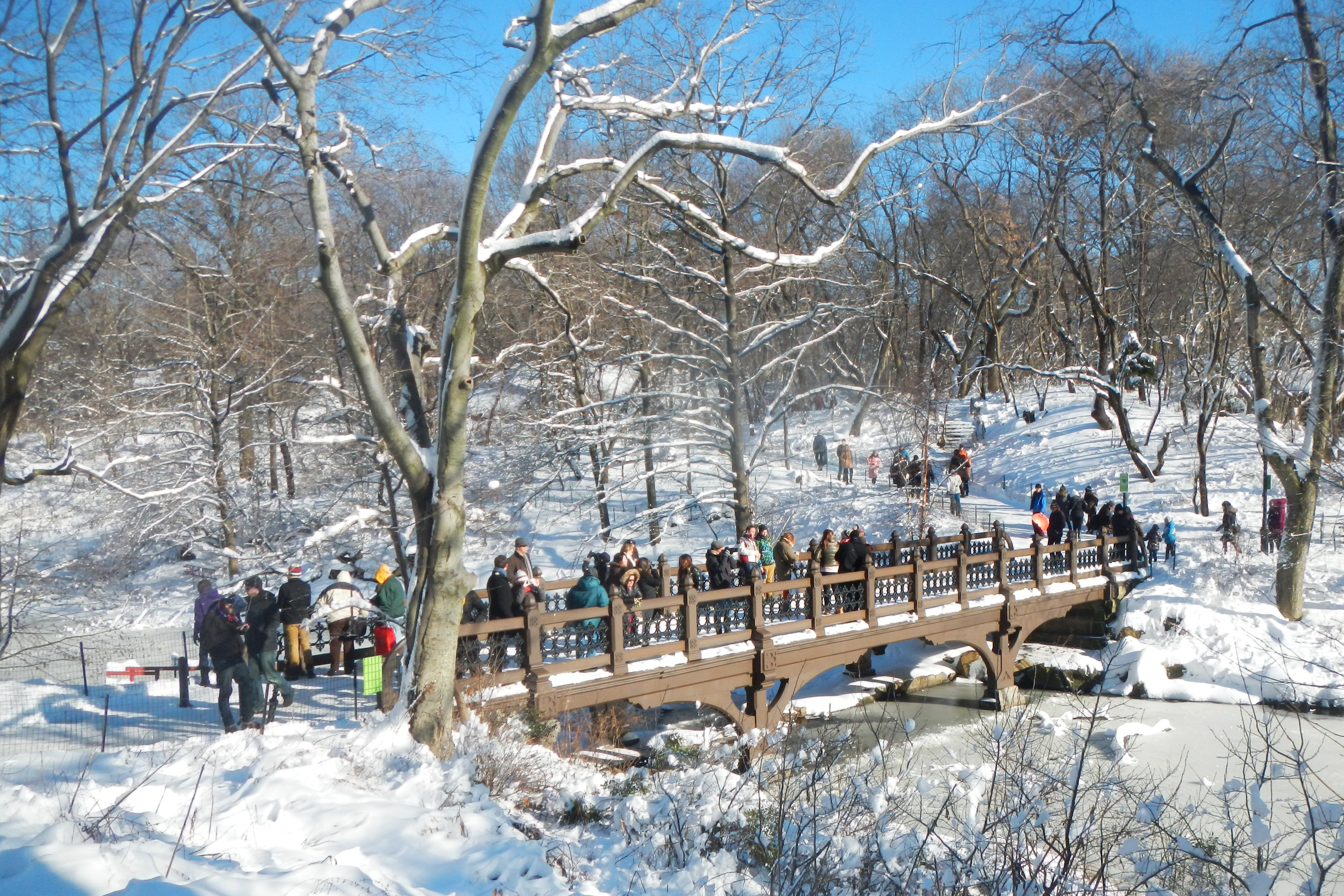
Oak Bridge spanning Bank Rock Bay was replaced in 2009 following Calvert Vaux's original design of 1860

The Conservancy began major restoration work at the northern end of the park beginning in 1989, following several assaults on April 19, 1989 in the Central Park jogger case. Work on the Ravine in the northern part of the park was completed by 1992. The following year, the Conservancy announced a $51 million capital campaign. This resulted in the restoration of bridle trails, the Mall, the Harlem Meer, and the North Woods, as well as the construction of the Dana Discovery Center at the Harlem Meer.

Afterward, the Conservancy embarked on its most ambitious landscape restoration: the overhaul of the 55 acres (22 hectares) near the Great Lawn and Turtle Pond. The project was the centerpiece of the Conservancy's three-year Wonder of New York Campaign, which raised $71.5 million and also helped restore southern and western landscapes, as well as the North Meadow. The Great Lawn project was completed in 1997.

Though they operated under a memorandum of understanding as a public-private partnership for 18 years, the Conservancy and the City of New York did not formalize a management agreement until 1998, during the administration of Mayor Rudy Giuliani. Under the agreement, the city retained control over major policy decisions about the Park as well as the enforcement of rules and laws within it, while the Conservancy assumed responsibility for day-to-day maintenance and operations. The Conservancy's original contract with the City was renewed in 2006. Under the eight-year agreement, the Conservancy receives an annual fee for services.

Citywide budget cuts in the early 1990s resulted in attrition of the park's routine maintenance staff, and the Conservancy began hiring staff to replace these workers. Management of the restored landscapes by the Conservancy's "zone gardeners" proved so successful that core maintenance and operations staff were reorganized in 1996. The zone-based system of management was implemented throughout the park, which was divided into 49 zones. The Conservancy recruited volunteers to also help in maintenance. In 2007, there were 3,000 volunteers compared to just under 250 paid workers in the park.

=== 2000s to present ===
Renovation work continued through the first decade of the 21st century. Conservatory Water was restored over six months in 2000, and the restoration of the Pond began the same year. A new Reservoir fence was installed in 2004 under a capital project that replaced the old chain-link fence with a replica of the 8,000-foot long steel and cast-iron one that had enclosed the Reservoir in 1926. The new fence, along with removal of invasive trees and shrubs, restored the panoramic views of the park and Manhattan skyline.

Another ambitious restoration effort began in 2004, when Conservancy staff and contractors worked together to refurbish the ceiling of the Bethesda Arcade. Originally designed by Calvert Vaux and Jacob Wrey Mould, the ceiling of the Arcade is lined by 15,876 elaborately patterned encaustic tiles. Salt and water infiltration from the roadway above had badly damaged the tiles, leaving their backing plates so corroded they had to be removed in the 1980s. The tiles were held in storage for more than 20 years until the Conservancy embarked on a $7 million restoration effort in 2004 to return the Minton tiles to their original luster. The completed Bethesda Terrace Arcade was unveiled in March 2007.

The Ramble and Lake were renovated by the Central Park Conservancy, in a project to enhance both their ecological and scenic aspects. In 2007 the first phase of a restoration of the Lake and its shoreline plantings commenced. During the same time, Bank Rock Bridge was recreated in carved oak with cast-iron panels and pine decking, its original materials, following Vaux's original design of 1859–60. The cascade, where the Gill empties into the lake, was reconstructed to approximate its dramatic original form. The island formerly in the lake, which had gradually eroded below water level, was replanted with aqueous plants such as Pickerel weed. The first renovated sections were opened to visitors in April 2008 and the project was complete by 2012. The final feature to be restored was the East Meadow, which was rehabilitated in 2011.

The Conservancy began raising money for a $300 million cleanup initiative in 2013, and within three years, it had raised over a third of that amount. Minor renovation projects continued through the park in the late 2010s. The Belvedere Castle was closed in 2018 for an extensive renovation, reopening in June 2019. In 2018, the Conservancy announced that the Delacorte Theater would be closed for a $110 million renovation; the Delacorte closed for renovation in September 2023 and reopened in June 2025. The Central Park Conservancy further announced that Lasker Rink would be closed for renovation starting in 2021, and it reopened in April 2025 as the Davis Center. Also in 2025, the Conservancy created the Central Park Conservancy Ranger Corps to handle quality-of-life issues and help homeless individuals; the corps was funded by $50 million from the Conservancy's endowment.

== Responsibilities ==
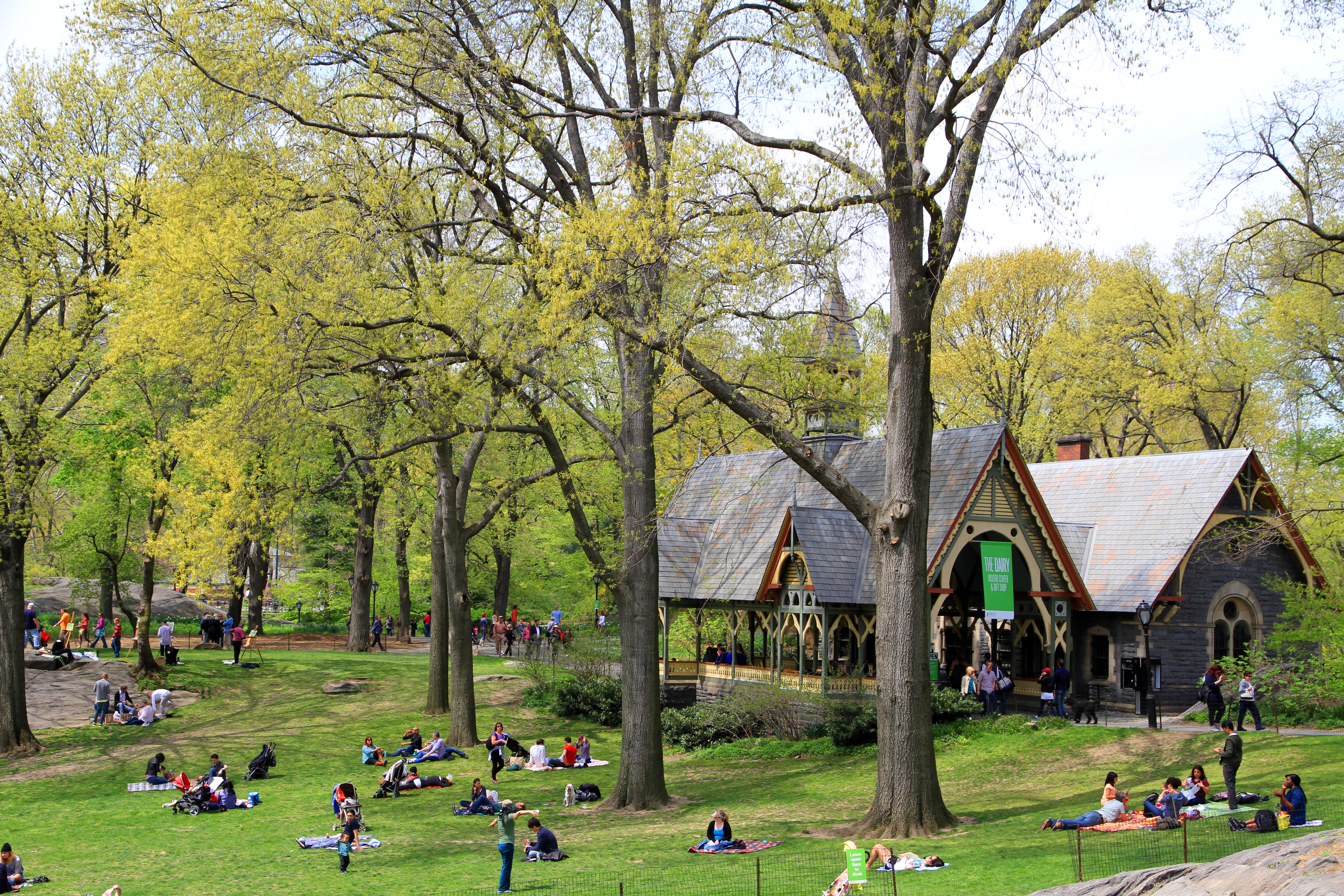
The Dairy, one of the visitor centers in Central Park operated by the Conservancy

=== Park maintenance and visitor information ===
A path through a wooded area in Central Park

Conservancy crews care for 250 acres (100 ha) acres of lawns, 150 acres (61 ha) of lakes and streams, 80 acres (32 ha) of woodlands, and approximately 18,000 trees. The Conservancy's staff installs hundreds of thousands of plantings annually, including bulbs, shrubs, flowers, and trees. They maintain 10,000 benches, 26 ballfields, and 21 playgrounds and are responsible for the preservation of 55 sculptures and monuments and 36 arches and bridges.

Conservancy crews remove graffiti and collect more than 2,000 tons of trash a year. The Conservancy maintains a zone-management system, which divides Central Park into territories managed by individual supervisors who are held accountable for their zone's condition. The park has 49 zones managed by "zone gardeners" who work with volunteers and specialty crews to maintain their designated landscapes. The Conservancy also collects and brings recyclable items such as paper and plastic to the Mount in the northern part of the park, where the New York City Department of Sanitation collects the items. As part of a pilot program, the Conservancy added pizza box recycling receptacles to the park in 2024.

The Conservancy operates five visitor centers in Central Park: Charles A. Dana Discovery Center, Belvedere Castle, Chess & Checkers House, the Dairy, and Columbus Circle. These visitor centers distribute maps and other information about the park. The Dairy contains the park's official gift shop.

=== Events and activities ===
Central Park Conservancy hosts a number of events and activities, such as festivals, games, volunteering opportunities, and tours. Every August since 2003, the Conservancy has hosted the Central Park Film Festival, a series of free film screenings. The Conservancy also hosts Harlem Meer Performance Festival, a free concert series held each summer since 1993. Other activities include catch-and-release fishing in the Harlem Meer; official tours of the park; and board games. Every year, the conservancy sponsors parties such as the springtime Frederick Law Olmsted Awards Luncheon (first hosted in 1983) and a fall luncheon.

=== Programs ===
Central Park Conservancy's educational division, the Institute for Urban Parks, was founded in 2013 and, according to the Conservancy’s website, draws on its “expertise” in park management “to empower, inform, connect, and celebrate the individuals and organizations that care for urban parks.” The program has assisted with the development of new parks such as the High Line and Brooklyn Bridge Park. Its Five-Borough Program provides staff and programming assistance to parks around the city.

The Conservancy has also participated in cleanup and maintenance initiatives for other New York City parks. In 2005, the Conservancy created the Historic Harlem Parks initiative, providing maintenance, gardening support, and mentoring to workers in Morningside Park, St. Nicholas Park, Jackie Robinson Park, and Marcus Garvey Park in Harlem. In late 2014, mayor Bill de Blasio announced an initiative where the Conservancy, as well as seven other organizations that care for the city's large public parks, would donate workers, labors, and money to assist smaller parks in New York City's poorer neighborhoods. The Central Park Conservancy would be involved in the cleanup of two dozen parks, and would train gardeners and deploy the Five-Borough Crew to these parks.

== Management ==
The Conservancy's founding board members ex officio included William Sperry Beinecke and Elizabeth Barlow Rogers, as well as mayor Koch, park commissioner Davis, and Manhattan borough president Andrew Stein. Beinecke was the chair of the board of the Central Park Conservancy, while Rogers was the initial president of the Conservancy.

The Conservancy has been led by five presidents over its history. Elizabeth Barlow Rogers, the first and longest-serving president, was appointed as administrator in 1979 and named the Conservancy's first president upon its founding in 1980. She stepped down as both Conservancy president and Central Park administrator at the end of 1995. Karen H. Putnam, who worked as the Conservancy's development director, took over both posts. Douglas Blonsky took over the role of Central Park administrator in 1998. The presidency was not Blonsky's first role in the Conservancy; he had originally been hired as construction supervisor for the Park in 1985 by Rogers.

After Putnam resigned as Conservancy president in 2000, Regina S. Peruggi took on the role, leaving her position as president of Marymount Manhattan College. Peruggi stepped down in 2004 to become president of Kingsborough Community College, and Blonsky took over the role of Conservancy president. Upon Blonsky's retirement in 2017, Elizabeth W. Smith became president in March 2018.

== Financing ==
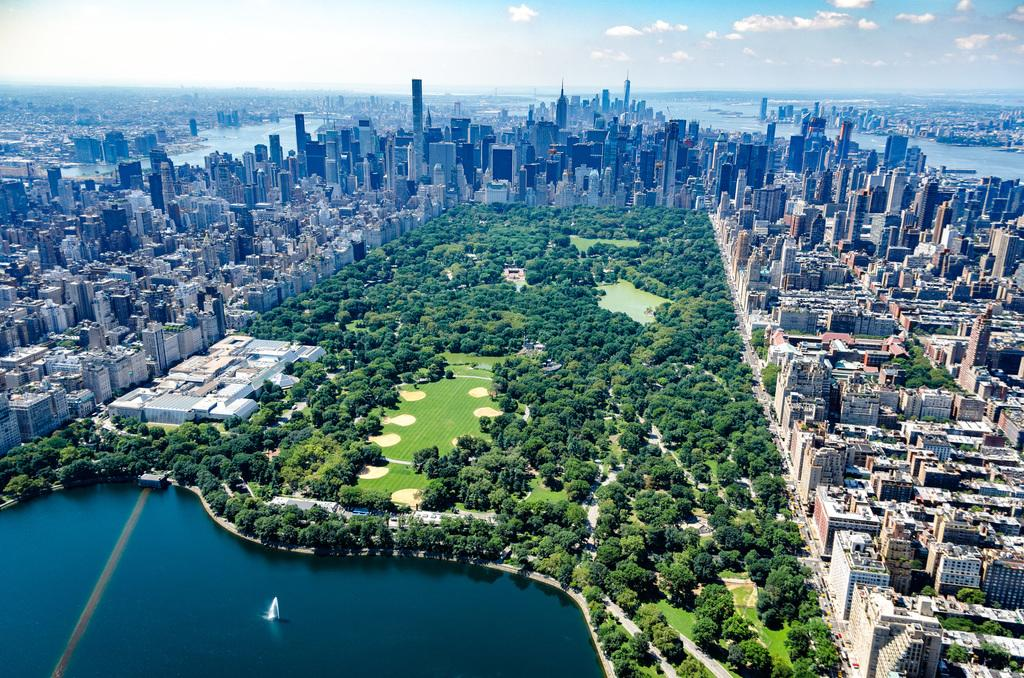
Aerial view of southern Central Park in 2017, following the completion of the Conservancy's park renovation projects

In the fiscal year ending June 30, 2024, the Central Park Conservancy had net assets (own equity) of $622.067 million and liabilities of $55.356 million, which amounted to total assets of $677.423 million. Net assets increased $83.030 million from the fiscal year ending June 30, 2023. For tax purposes, the Conservancy's Employer Identification Number is 13-3022855.

The Conservancy had an annual operating budget of $65–67 million in 2016, of which 75% comes from donations and the balance from municipal and state tax revenue. The Central Park Conservancy's overall endowment was over $200 million in 2014. Much of this amount came from large donations. The largest was in October 2012, when hedge fund manager John A. Paulson announced a $100 million gift to the Central Park Conservancy, the largest ever monetary donation to New York City's park system. Prior to Paulson's gift, the majority of donations to the Conservancy came from a relatively small group of 55,000 people who lived within a "10-minute walk" of Central Park. As of 2016, the Conservancy had spent nearly $800 million on improving Central Park.

== Honors ==
The Conservancy has received several awards and honors. In 2001, the Conservancy and three other organizations were given the Award for Outstanding Commitment to the Preservation and Care of Collections by the American Institute for Conservation. In 2008, the American Planning Association recognized Central Park for being one of that year's Great Public Spaces in America. The association described the Park as "arguably the most emulated park in the country" and cited it as "an exemplary public space that successfully maintains a large naturalistic landscape in the midst of one of the densest cities in the country." Additionally, in 2017, the American Society of Landscape Architects gave the Conservancy the Landscape Architecture Medal of Excellence.

== See also ==
- 10-Minute Walk
- Public-private partnerships in the United States
