= Albert Berg (surgeon) =

American surgeon of Hungarian heritage

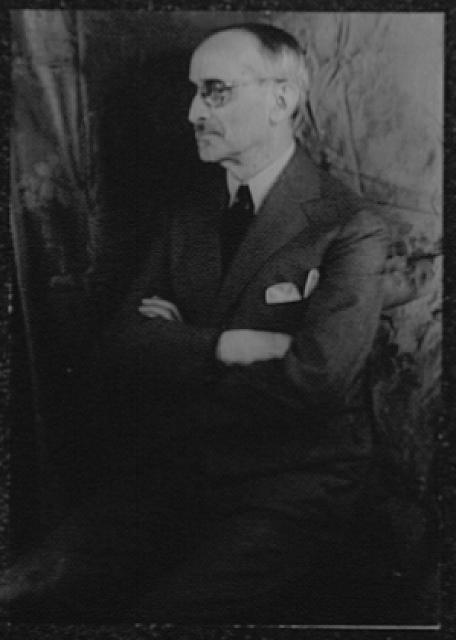
Albert Berg (1950)

Albert Ashton Berg (August 10, 1872 in New York – July 1, 1950) was an American surgeon of Hungarian heritage. He had three sisters and four brothers.

Berg attended New York public schools, City College and Columbia University College of Physicians and Surgeons.

Berg trained at Mount Sinai Hospital in Manhattan from 1894 to 1896, before being appointed to its staff as an adjunct surgeon in 1899. He was later promoted to associate surgeon (1911) and attending surgeon (1914). Berg was chief of the gastrointestinal service there between 1915 and 1934, when he retired from active service, becoming a consulting surgeon. At the behest of his colleague Richard Lewisohn, Berg performed the first subtotal gastric resection for peptic ulcer in the United States. Berg was "a strong advocate of the procedure and reported more than 500 cases, in which a recurrence rate of slightly over 1% was compared to a recurrence rate of 34% after gastroenterostomy alone". Berg "gain[ed] nationwide renown as an innovator in the field of abdominal surgery". He was President of the International College of Surgeons from 1943 to 1947, as well as a Fellow of the New York Academy of Medicine and an Honorary Fellow of the Roman and Turin Surgical Societies.

Berg, who was "an indefatigable and extremely facile surgeon", along with his brother Henry (1858 – 1938), donated a collection of over 35,000 printed works on American and English literature to the New York Public Library (the Henry W. and Albert A. Berg Collection of English and American Literature). The collection was established on October 11, 1940, and endowed in Henry's memory.

At the time of his death in 1950, following kidney surgery, Berg was a consulting surgeon at a number of other hospitals.

== Selected works ==
- Berg, Albert Ashton (1905). Surgical Diagnosis: A Manual for Students and Practitioners. Lea Brothers.
- Berg, Albert A. (September 1930). "The mortality and late results of subtotal gastrectomy for the radical cure of gastric and duodenal ulcer". Annals of Surgery. 92 (3): 340–366. doi:10.1097/00000658-193009000-00004. ISSN 0003-4932. PMC 1398282. PMID 17866371.
