= Gregg LeFevre =

American artist known for bronze reliefs

- Born: Utica, New York, U.S.
- Education: Boston University
- Occupations: Sculptor; public artist; photographer
- Notable work: Library Way
- Awards: NYC Arts Commission Excellence in Design Award (1998)

Gregg LeFevre is an American sculptor, public artist, experimental photographer best known for creating site-specific bronze relief works that combine text and imagery and are set in the paving in urban environments. LeFevre has produced more than 200 permanent public artworks.

== Biography ==
LeFevre was born in Utica, New York. His mother was a WASP. His first artworks were inspired by flights with his mother and the terrain of Upstate New York as seen from above. LeFevre studied at Boston University, where he received his Bachelor of Arts degree in 1969.

LeFevre often works with bronze reliefs, cast metals, and other architectural materials. His work is frequently integrated into street-scapes, plazas, and buildings. He often works in collaboration with his business and artistic partner Jennifer Andrews.

One of his most notable projects is Library Way (1998–2001), a series of 96 bronze sidewalk plaques installed along East 41st Street in Midtown Manhattan, created in partnership with the New York Public Library and the Grand Central Partnership. The project features illustrated quotations from writers about books and reading. In 1998, LeFevre was awarded a NYC Arts Commission Excellence in Design Award for the project. LeFevre’s work is also installed at a number of other locations in New York City, including Herald Square, Union Square, Foley Square and the Brooklyn Promenade. Elsewhere around the United States he has work in Boston, his Boston Bricks are set in a historic lane and early sculptures are set at Boston University, Philadelphia’s Chinatown, Salt Lake City, and Harry Reid International Airport in Las Vegas.

LeFevre also works as a photographer and creates three-dimensional photographic reliefs.
