= New York Public Library Main Branch =

Library building in Manhattan, New York

Stephen A. Schwarzman Building
- Main Branch
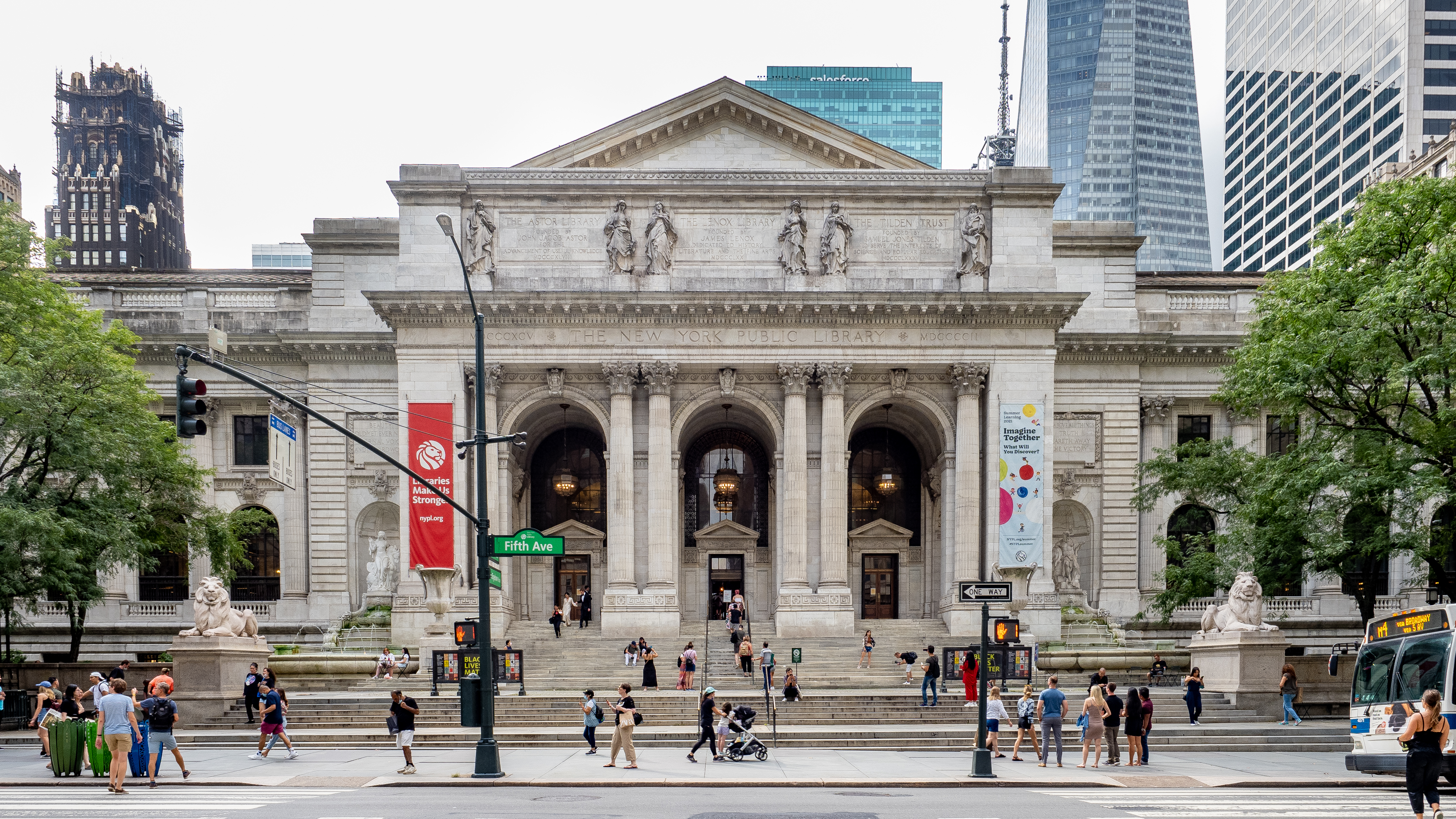
- The main entrance on Fifth Avenue
- Location: 476 Fifth Avenue, Manhattan, New York 10018, United States
- Type: Research library
- Established: May 23, 1911 (opened to public)
- Architect: Carrère and Hastings
- Branch of: New York Public Library

Collection
- Items collected: Approximately 2.5 million (2015) (Note: The number of items varies widely between 1.8 and 4 million, and a figure of 3.5 million is often cited. However, in 2015, the New York Public Library said that the Main Branch's collection numbered 2.5 million.)

Other information
- Website: nypl.org/schwarzman
- 40°45′11″N 73°58′55″W

History
- Built: 1897–1911

Site notes
- Architectural style: Beaux-Arts

U.S. National Historic Landmark
- Designated: December 21, 1965
- Reference no.: 66000546

U.S. National Register of Historic Places
- Designated: October 15, 1966
- Reference no.: 66000546

New York State Register of Historic Places
- Designated: June 23, 1980
- Reference no.: 06101.000079

New York City Landmark
- Designated: January 11, 1967
- Reference no.: 0246
- Designated entity: Facade

New York City Landmark
- Designated: November 12, 1974
- Reference no.: 0880
- Designated entity: Interior: Astor Hall, Stairs, and McGraw Rotunda

New York City Landmark
- Designated: August 8, 2017
- Reference no.: 2592
- Designated entity: Interior: Rose Main Reading Room and Public Catalog Room

The Stephen A. Schwarzman Building (commonly known as the Main Branch, the 42nd Street Library, or just the New York Public Library (Note: As the flagship building of the New York Public Library system, the Main Branch is often referred to as just the New York Public Library. The branch was originally called the Central Building and was later known as the Humanities and Social Science Center.)) is the flagship building in the New York Public Library system in the Midtown neighborhood of Manhattan in New York City. The branch, one of four research libraries in the library system, has nine divisions. Four stories of the structure are open to the public. The main entrance steps are at Fifth Avenue at its intersection with East 41st Street. As of 2015, the branch contains an estimated 2.5 million volumes in its stacks. The building was declared a National Historic Landmark, a National Register of Historic Places site, and a New York City designated landmark in the 1960s.

The Main Branch was built after the New York Public Library was formed as a combination of two libraries in the late 1890s. The site, along Fifth Avenue between 40th and 42nd Streets, is located directly east of Bryant Park, on the site of the Croton Reservoir. The architectural firm Carrère and Hastings constructed the structure in the Beaux-Arts style, and the structure opened on May 23, 1911. The marble facade of the building contains ornate detailing, and the Fifth Avenue entrance is flanked by a pair of stone lions that serve as the library's icon. The interior of the building contains the Main Reading Room, a space measuring 78 by 297 feet (24 by 91 m) with a 52-foot-high (16 m) ceiling; a Public Catalog Room; and various reading rooms, offices, and art exhibitions.

The Main Branch became popular after its opening and saw four million annual visitors by the 1920s. It formerly contained a circulating library, though the circulating division of the Main Branch moved to the nearby Mid-Manhattan Library in 1970. Additional space for the library's stacks was constructed under adjacent Bryant Park in 1991, and the branch's Main Reading Room was restored in 1998. A major restoration from 2007 to 2011 was underwritten by a $100 million gift from businessman Stephen A. Schwarzman, for whom the branch was subsequently renamed. The branch underwent another expansion starting in 2018. The Main Branch has been featured in many television shows and films.

== History ==
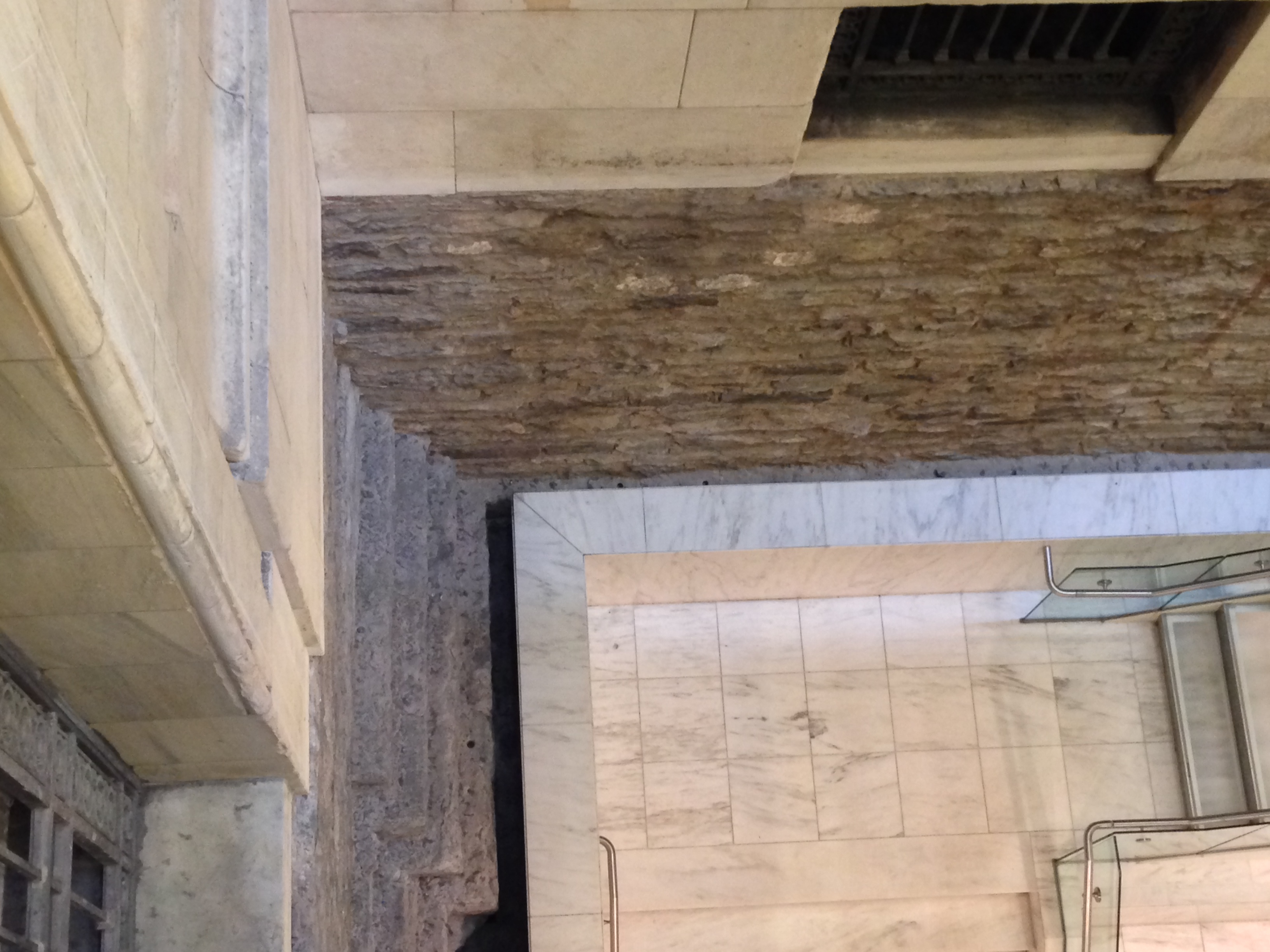
A remnant of the Croton distribution reservoir, seen at the foundation of the South Court in 2014

The consolidation of the Astor and Lenox Libraries into the New York Public Library in 1895, along with a large bequest from Samuel J. Tilden and a donation of $5.2 million from Andrew Carnegie, allowed for the creation of an enormous library system. The libraries had a combined 350,000 items after the merger, which was relatively small compared to other library systems at the time. As a point of civic pride, the New York Public Library's founders wanted an imposing main branch. While the American Museum of Natural History and the Metropolitan Museum of Art's Fifth Avenue branch were both located on prominent sites facing Central Park in Manhattan, there was no such site available for a main library building; furthermore, most of the city's libraries were either private collections or small branch libraries.

=== Development ===
==== Site and design selection ====
Several sites were considered, including those of the Astor and Lenox Libraries. In March 1896, the trustees of the libraries ultimately chose a new site along Fifth Avenue between 40th and 42nd Streets, because it was centrally located between the Astor and Lenox Libraries. At the time, it was occupied by the obsolete Croton Reservoir, remnants of which still exist on the library floor. The library's trustees convinced mayor William L. Strong to give them the reservoir site, after they gave him studies showing that the size of New York City's library collection lagged behind those of many other cities. Dr. John Shaw Billings, who was named the first director of the New York Public Library, had created an early sketch for a massive reading room on top of seven floors of book-stacks, combined with the fastest system for getting books into the hands of those who requested to read them. His design for the new library, though controversial for its time, formed the basis of the Main Branch. Once the Main Branch was opened, the Astor and Lenox Libraries were planned to close, and their functions were planned to be merged into that of the Main Branch.

In May 1897, the New York State Legislature passed a bill allowing the site of the Croton Reservoir to be used for a public library building. The Society of Beaux-Arts Architects hosted an architectural design competition for the library, with two rounds. The rules of the competition's first round were never published, but they were used as the basis for later design competitions. Entrants submitted 88 designs, of which 12 were selected for a semi-finalist round and six went on to a finalist round. About a third of the designs, 29 in total, followed the same design principles outlined in Billings's original sketch. Each of the semifinalist designs were required to include specific architectural features, including limestone walls; a central delivery desk; reading rooms with large windows; and stacks illuminated by sunlight. The six finalists were selected by a jury composed of library trustees and architects. The jury relaxed the requirement that the proposals adhere to a specific floor plan after McKim, Mead & White, which had received the most votes from the jury, nearly withdrew from the competition. All of the finalist designs were in the Beaux-Arts style.

Ultimately, in November 1897, the relatively unknown firm of Carrère and Hastings was selected to design and construct the new library. The jury named the firm of Howard & Cauldwell and McKim, Mead, & White as runners-up. Carrère and Hastings created a model for the future library building, which was exhibited at New York City Hall in 1900. Whether John Mervin Carrère or Thomas S. Hastings contributed more to the design is in dispute, but both architects are honored with busts located at the bottoms of each of Astor Hall's two staircases. In a later interview with The New York Times, Carrère stated that the library would contain "twenty-five or thirty different rooms", each with their own specialty; "eighty-three miles of books" in its stacks; and a general reading room that could fit a thousand guests. During the design process, Hastings had wanted to shift the library building closer to Sixth Avenue, and he also proposed sinking 42nd Street to create a forecourt for the library, but both plans were rejected. The New York City Board of Estimate approved Carrère and Hastings's plans for the library in December 1897.

==== Construction ====
Construction was delayed by the objections of mayor Robert Anderson Van Wyck, who expressed concerns that the city's finances were unstable. As a result, the planned library was delayed for a year. The Board of Estimate authorized a bond measure of $500,000 in May 1899. The next month, contractor Eugene Lentilhon started excavating the Croton Reservoir, and workers began digging through the reservoir's 25-foot-thick (7.6 m) wall. After spending seven weeks tunneling through the wall, Lentilhon determined that the floor of the reservoir could only be demolished using dynamite. Work on the foundation commenced in May 1900, and much of the Croton Reservoir had been excavated by 1901. In November 1900, work was hindered by a water main break that partly flooded the old reservoir. Norcross Brothers received the general contract, although this was initially controversial because the firm was not the lowest bidder. After a private ceremony to mark the start of construction was held in August 1902, a ceremonial cornerstone was laid on November 10, 1902. The cornerstone contained a box of artifacts from the library and the city. The architects awarded the contract for the library's stacks to Snead & Company; for drainage and plumbing to M. J. O'Brien; for interior finishes to the John Peirce Company; and for electric equipment to the Lord Electric Company.

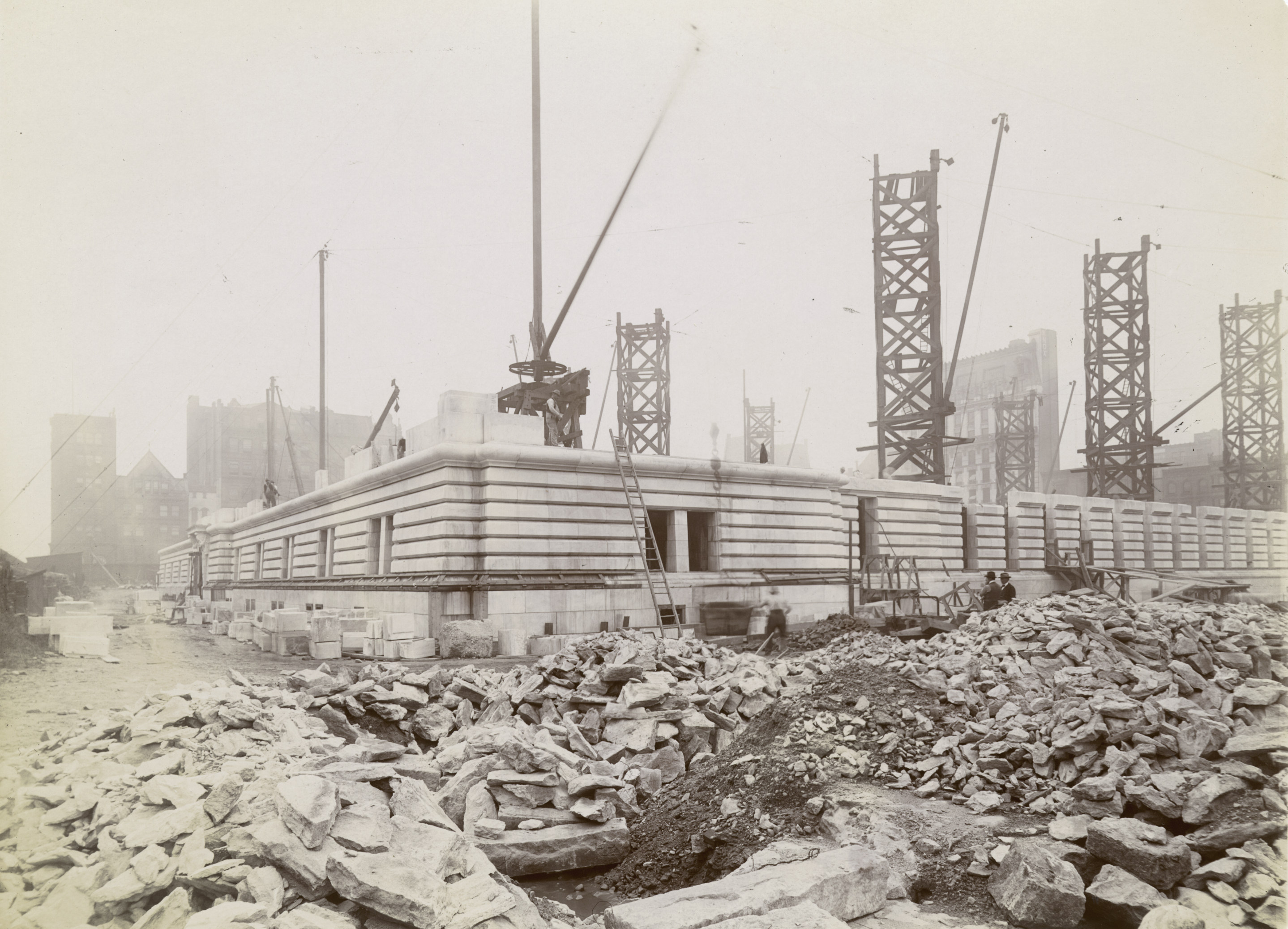
Progress on the marble work, c. 1903

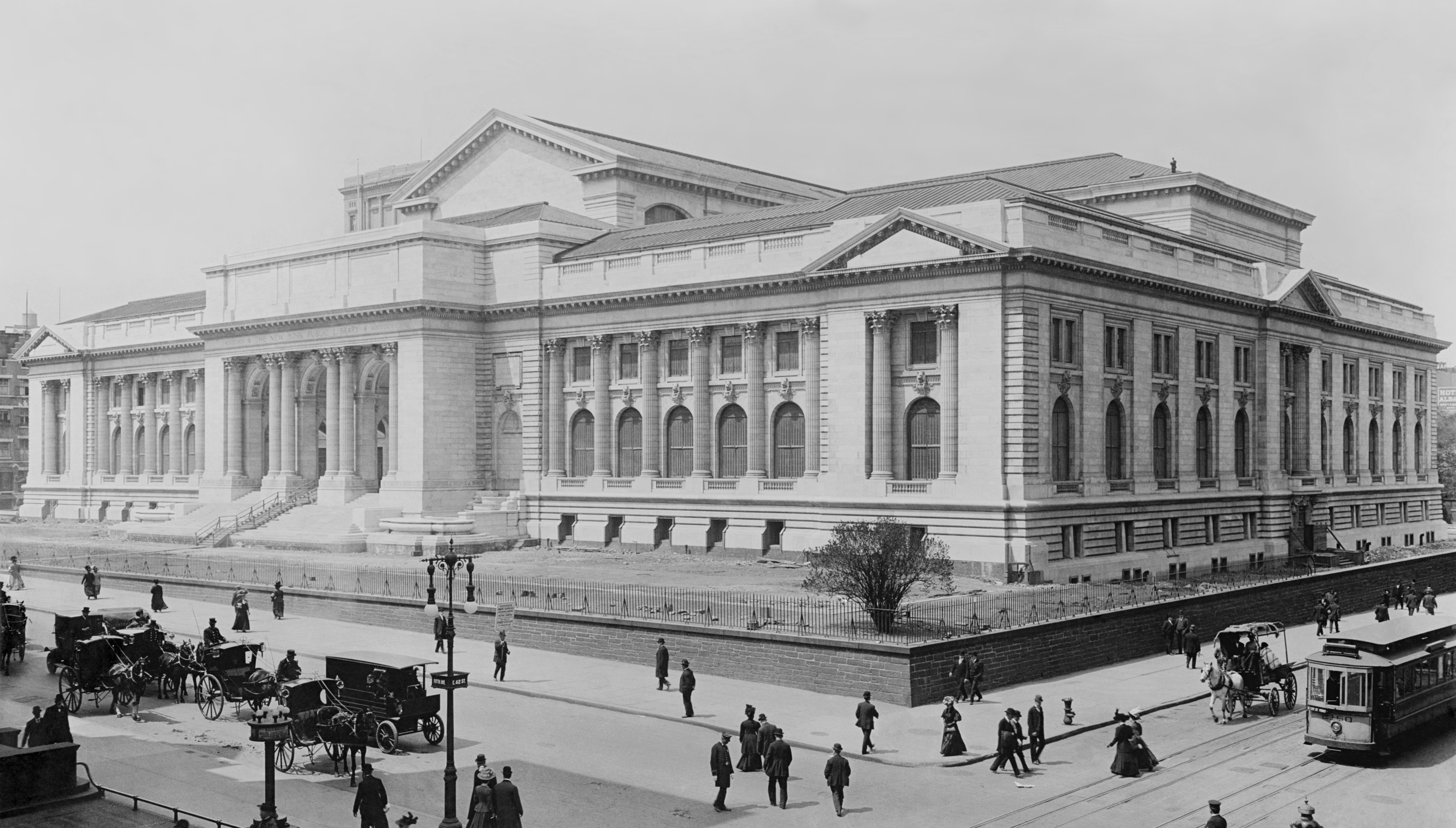
Front elevation in 1908; the lion statues at the Main Branch had not yet been installed.

Work progressed gradually on the library: the basement was completed by 1903, and the first floor by 1904. However, exterior work was delayed due to the high cost of securing large amounts of marble, as well as frequent labor strikes. When the Norcross Brothers' contract expired in August 1904, the exterior was only halfway completed. During mid-1905, giant columns were put into place and work on the roof was begun; the roof was finished by December 1906. The remaining contracts, totaling $1.2 million, concerned the installation of furnishings in the interior. The interior and exterior were largely constructed simultaneously. The building's exterior was mostly done by the end of 1907. The pace of construction was generally sluggish; in 1906, an official for the New York Public Library stated that some of the exterior and most of the interior was not finished.

Contractors started painting the main reading room and catalog room in 1908, and began installing furniture the following year. Starting in 1910, around 75 miles (121 km) worth of shelves were installed to hold the collections that were designated for being housed there, with substantial room left for future acquisitions. It took one year to transfer and install the books from the Astor and Lenox Libraries. Late in the construction process, a proposal to install a municipal light plant in the basement of the Main Branch was rejected. By late 1910, the library was nearly completed, and officials forecast an opening date of May 1911. Carrère died before the building was opened, and in March 1911, two thousand people viewed his coffin in the library's rotunda.

=== Opening ===
On May 23, 1911, officials held a ceremony to open the main branch of the New York Public Library. U.S. president William Howard Taft presided over the ceremony, whose 15,000 guests included governor John Alden Dix and mayor William Jay Gaynor. The public was invited the following day, May 24, and tens of thousands went to the Library's "jewel in the crown". The first item called for was Philosophy of the Plays of Shakespeare Unfolded by Delia Bacon, although this was a publicity stunt, and the book was not in the Main Branch's collection at the time. The first item actually delivered was N. I. Grot's Nravstvennye idealy nashego vremeni ("Ethical Ideas of Our Time"), a study of Friedrich Nietzsche and Leo Tolstoy. The reader filed his slip at 9:08 a.m. and received his book seven minutes later.

The Beaux-Arts Main Branch was the largest marble structure up to that time in the United States, with shelf space for 3.5 million volumes spread across 375,000 square feet (34,800 m^{2}). The projected final cost was $10 million, excluding the cost of the books and the land, representing a fourfold increase over the initial cost estimate of $2.5 million. The structure ultimately cost $9 million to build, over three times as much as originally projected. Because there were so many visitors during the first week of the Main Branch's opening, the New York Public Library's directors initially did not count the number of visitors, but guessed that 250,000 patrons were accommodated during the first week. The construction of the Main Branch, along with that of the nearby Grand Central Terminal, helped to revitalize Bryant Park.

=== 20th-century growth ===
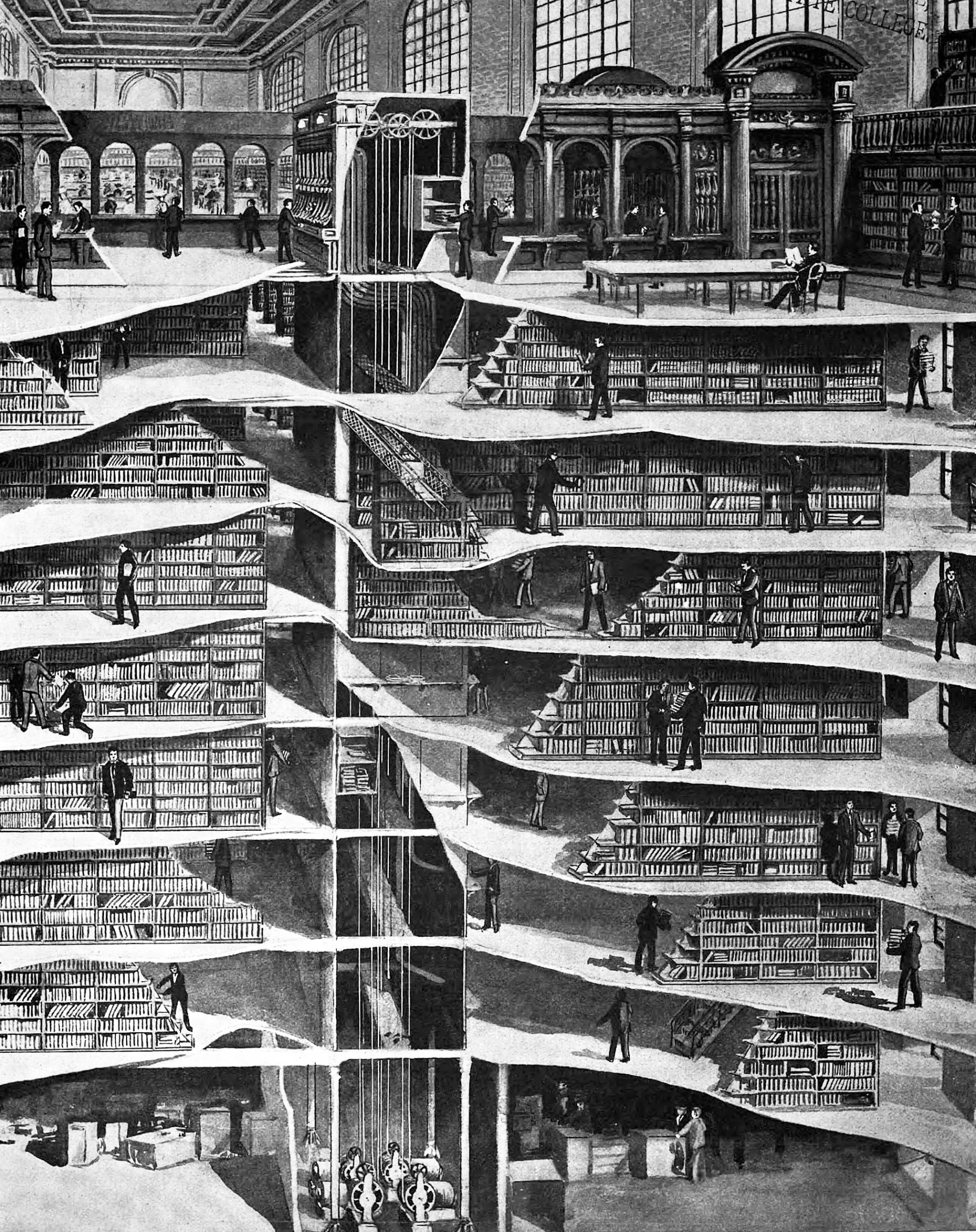
Sectional view of the Main Branch from a 1911 issue of Scientific American

The Main Branch came to be regarded as an architectural landmark. As early as 1911, Harper's Monthly magazine praised the architecture of "this interesting and important building". In 1971, New York Times architectural critic Ada Louise Huxtable wrote, "As urban planning, the library still suits the city remarkably well" and praised its "gentle monumentality and knowing humanism". Architectural historian Kate Lemos wrote in 2006 that the library "has held a commanding presence at the bustling corner of 42nd Street and Fifth Avenue as the neighborhood grew up around it".

The Main Branch also took on importance as a major research center. Norbert Pearlroth, who served as a researcher for the Ripley's Believe It or Not! book series, perused an estimated 7,000 books annually from 1923 to 1975. Other patrons included First Lady of the United States Jacqueline Kennedy Onassis; writers Alfred Kazin, Norman Mailer, Frank McCourt, John Updike, Cecil Beaton, Isaac Bashevis Singer, and E. L. Doctorow; actors Helen Hayes, Marlene Dietrich, Lillian Gish, Diana Rigg, and Princess Grace Kelly of Monaco; playwright Somerset Maugham; film producer Francis Ford Coppola; journalists Eliezer Ben-Yehuda and Tom Wolfe; and boxer Joe Frazier. The Main Branch was also used for major works and invention. Edwin Land conducted research at the building for his later invention, the Land Camera, while Chester Carlson invented Xerox photocopiers after researching photoconductivity and electrostatics at the library. During World War II, American soldiers decoded a Japanese cipher based on a Mexican phone book whose last remaining copy among Allied nations existed at the Main Branch. In 1987 the library gained the original Winnie-the-Pooh stuffed toys which are displayed in the Children's Center on the ground floor.

==== 1920s and 1930s ====
Initially, the Main Branch was opened at 1 p.m. on Sundays and 9 a.m. on all other days, and it closed at 10 p.m. each day. This was to encourage patrons to use the new library. By 1926, the library was heavily patronized, with up to 1,000 people per hour requesting books. The library was most used between 10 a.m. to 12 p.m. and 3:30 to 5:50 p.m., and from October through May. The most highly requested books were those for economics and American and English literature, though during World War I geography books were the most demanded because of the ongoing war. It was estimated that 4 million people per year used the Main Branch in 1928, up from 2 million in 1918 and 3 million in 1926. There were 1.3 million books requested by nearly 600,000 people through call slips in 1927. By 1934, though annual patronage held steady at 4 million visitors, the Main Branch had 3.61 million volumes in its collection.

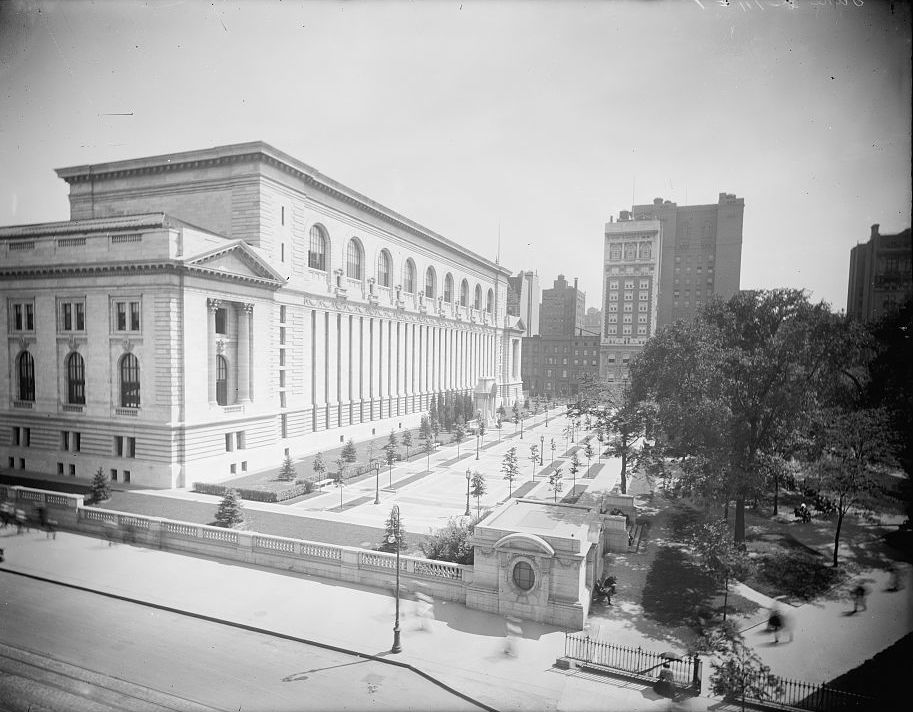
Back elevation, 1910s

Due to the increased demand for books, new shelves were installed in the stockrooms and the cellars by the 1920s to accommodate the expanded stacks. However, this still proved to be insufficient. The New York Public Library announced an expansion of the Main Branch in 1928. Thomas Hastings prepared plans for new wings near the north and south sides of the structure, which would extend eastward toward Fifth Avenue, as well as a storage annex in Bryant Park to the west. The expansion was planned to cost $2 million, but was never built. After Hastings died in 1929, it was revealed that his will contained $100,000 for modifications to the facade, with which he had been dissatisfied.

A theater collection was installed in the Main Reading Room in 1933. Two years later, the Bryant Park Open-Air Reading Room was established, operating during the summer. The reading room was meant to improve the morale of readers during the Great Depression, and it operated until 1943, when it closed down due to a shortage of librarians. In 1936, library trustee George F. Baker gave the Main Branch forty issues of the New-York Gazette from the 18th century, which had not been preserved anywhere else. In 1937, the doctors Albert and Henry Berg made an offer to the library's trustees to donate their collections of rare English and American literature. After Henry died, the collection was dedicated in his memory. The Berg Reading Room was formally dedicated in October 1940.

During the 1930s, Works Progress Administration (WPA) workers helped maintain the Main Branch. Their tasks included upgrading the heating, ventilation, and lighting systems; refitting the treads on the branch's marble staircases; painting the bookshelves, walls, ceilings, and masonry; and general upkeep. The WPA allocated $2.5 million for the building's maintenance. In January 1936, it was announced that the Main Branch's roof would be renovated as part of a seven-month WPA project.

==== 1940s to 1970s ====
Paul North Rice, who served as Chief of the Reference Department and directed the main branch from 1937 to 1953, significantly expanded the collection during his tenure. In 1942, the main exhibition room was converted into office space and partitioned off. During World War II, the fifteen large windows in the Main Reading Room were blacked out, though they were later uncovered. In the following years, the Main Reading Room became neglected: broken lighting fixtures were not replaced, and the room's windows were never cleaned. Unlike during World War I, war-related books at the Main Branch did not become popular during World War II. A room for members of the United States Armed Forces was opened in 1943. In 1944, the New York Public Library proposed another expansion plan. The stacks' capacity would be increased to 3 million books, and the circulating library in the Main Branch would be moved to a new 53rd Street Library. The circulating library at the Main Branch was ultimately kept for the time being, though its single room soon became insufficient to host all of the circulating volumes. Subsequently, in 1949, the library asked the city to take over responsibility for the Main Branch's circulating and children's libraries. As part of the modernization of the Main Branch, newly delivered books started being processed in that building, rather than at various circulation branch libraries.

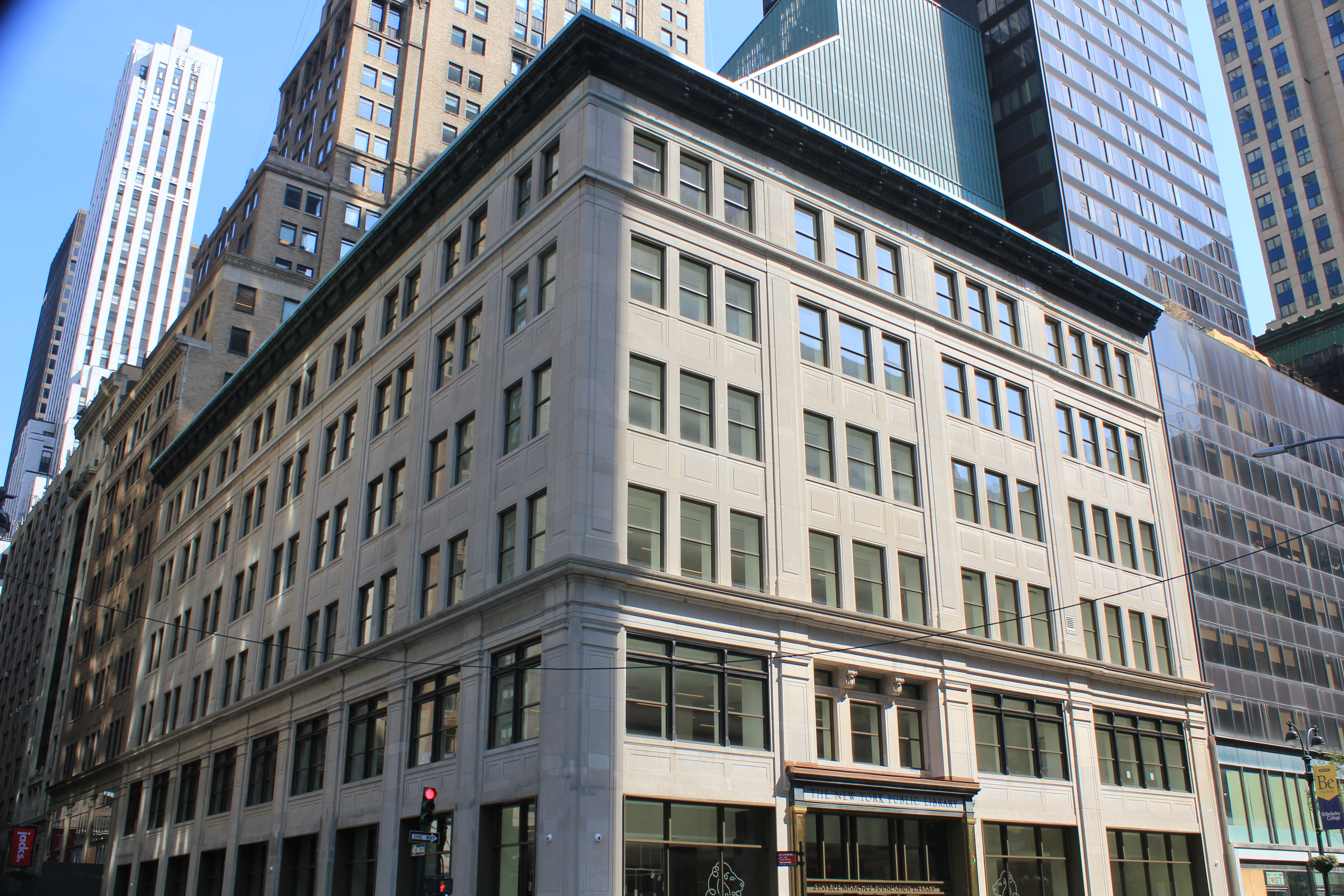
The Mid-Manhattan Library, which opened in 1970 and replaced the circulating library at the Main Branch

The rear of the library's main hall was partitioned off in 1950, creating a bursar's office measuring 42 by 13 ft (12.8 by 4.0 m). Minor repairs at the Main Branch occurred during the 1960s. The city government allocated money for the installation of fire sprinklers in the main branch's stacks in 1960. In 1964 contracts were awarded for the installation of a new floor level above the south corridor on the first floor, as well as for replacement of the skylights. By the mid-1960s, the branch contained 7 million volumes and had outgrown its 88 miles (142 km) of stacks.

The circulating facilities at the Main Branch continued to grow, and in 1961, the New York Public Library convened a group of six librarians to look for a new facility for the circulating department. The library bought the Arnold Constable & Company department store at 8 East 40th Street, at the southeast corner of Fifth Avenue and 40th Street across from the Main Branch. The Main Branch's circulating collection was moved to the Mid-Manhattan Library in 1970.

During the 1970s, the New York Public Library as a whole experienced financial troubles, which were exacerbated by the 1975 New York City fiscal crisis. As a cost-cutting measure, in 1970, the library decided to close the Main Branch during Sundays and holidays. The library also closed the Main Branch's science and technology division in late 1971 to save money, but private funds allowed the division to reopen in January 1972. The lions in front of the Main Branch's main entrance were restored in 1975. By the end of the decade, the Main Branch was in disrepair and the NYPL trustees were raising money for the research library's continued upkeep. The NYPL system was so short on funds that the research library was only open 43 hours a week until 1979, when Time Inc. and the Grace Krieble Delmas Foundation jointly donated $750,000 to extend the branch's operating hours.

==== 1980s and 1990s ====
Vartan Gregorian took over as president of the New York Public Library in 1981. At the time, many of the Main Branch's interior spaces had been subdivided and extensively modified, with offices in many of the spaces. The main exhibition room had been turned into an accounting office; the reading room's furniture had metal brackets screwed onto them; and there were lights, wires, and ducts hung throughout the space. Gregorian organized events to raise money for the library, which helped raise funds for the cleaning of the facade and the renovation of the lobby, roof, and lighting system. Architectural firm Davis Brody & Associates, architect Giorgio Cavaglieri, and architectural consultant Arthur Rosenblatt devised a master plan for the library. Before the master plan was implemented, the D. S. and R. H. Gottesman Foundation gave $1.25 million in December 1981 for the restoration of the main exhibition room, which was redesigned by Davis Brody and Cavaglieri.

Workers erected a temporary construction fence around the library's terraces in 1982. As part of a greater renovation of Bryant Park, Laurie Olin and Davis Brody redesigned the terraces, while Hugh Hardy redesigned the kiosks within the terraces. Several rooms were restored as part of the plan. The first space to be renovated, the periodical room, was completed in 1983 with a $20 million gift from Reader's Digest editor DeWitt Wallace. The exhibition room reopened in May 1984 and was renamed the Gottesman Exhibition Hall. The Catalog Room was restored starting in 1983. Ten million catalog cards, many of which were tattered, were replaced with photocopies that had been created over six years at a cost of $3.3 million. In addition, room 80 was renovated into a lecture hall called the Celeste Bartos Forum in 1987. Offices were relocated to former storage rooms on the ground level. Other divisions were added to the Main Branch during the 1980s, such as the Pforzheimer Collection of Shelley and His Circle in 1986, and the Wallach Division of Art, Prints and Photographs in 1987. The terraces on Fifth Avenue reopened in 1988 after they were restored.

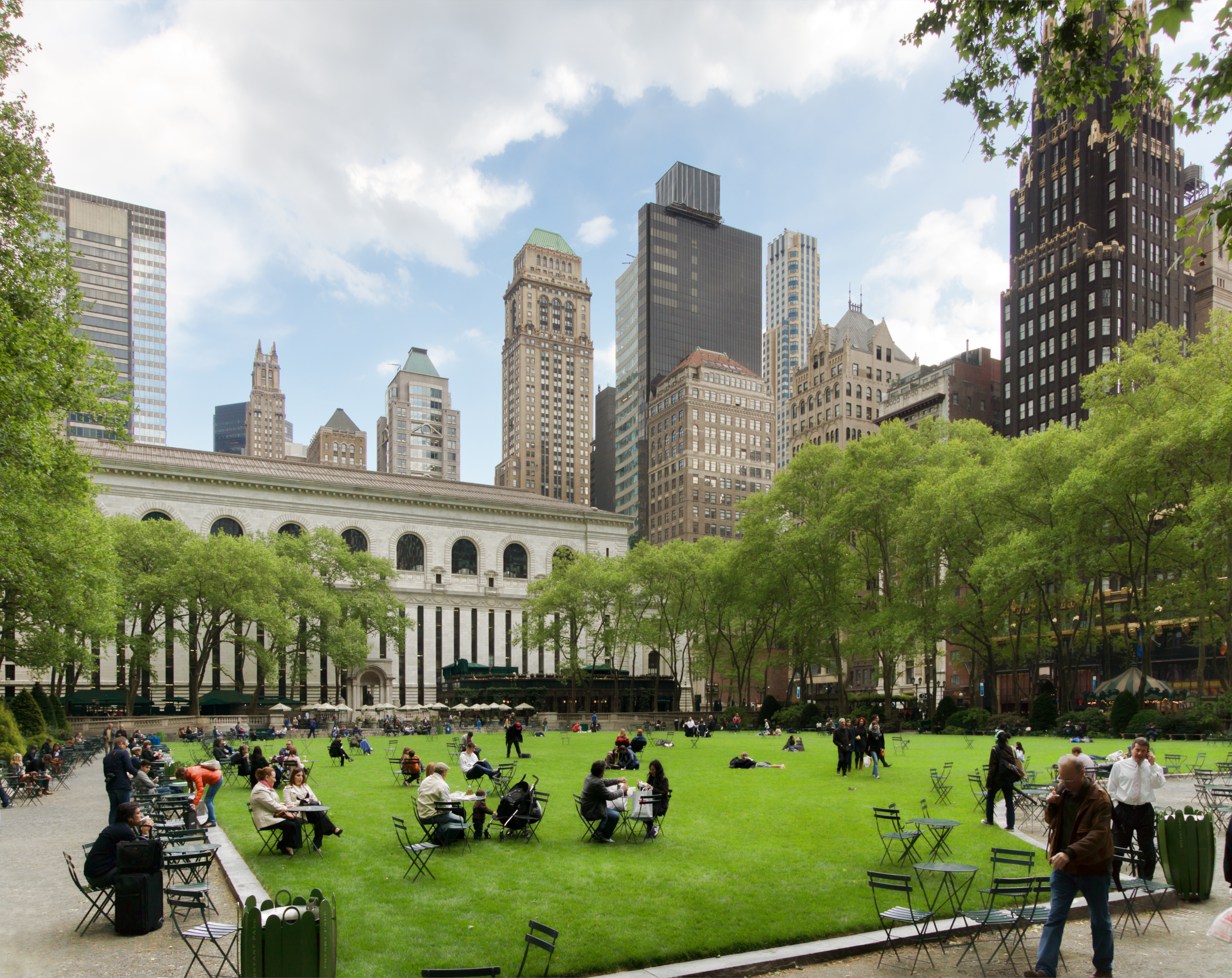
Bryant Park, underneath which additional stacks were constructed in the late 1980s

Meanwhile, the library was adding 150,000 volumes to its collections annually, which could not fit within the stacks of the existing building. In the late 1980s, the New York Public Library decided to expand the Main Branch's stacks to the west, underneath Bryant Park. The project was originally estimated to cost $21.6 million and would be the largest expansion project in the Main Branch's history. It was approved by the city's Art Commission in January 1987, and construction on the stacks started in July 1988. The expansion required that Bryant Park be closed to the public and then excavated, but because the park had grown dilapidated over the years, the stack-expansion project was seen as an opportunity to rebuild the park. The library added more than 120,000 square feet (11,000 m^{2}) of storage space and 84 miles (135 km) of bookshelves under Bryant Park, doubling the length of the stacks in the Main Branch. The space could accommodate 3.2 million books and a half-million reels of microfilm. The new stacks were connected to the Main Branch via a tunnel measuring 62 ft (19 m) or 120 ft (37 m) long. Once the underground facilities were completed, Bryant Park was completely rebuilt, with 2.5 or 6 feet (0.76 or 1.83 m) of earth between the park surface and the storage facility's ceiling. The extension was opened in September 1991 at a cost of $24 million; however, it only included one of two planned levels of stacks. Bryant Park was reopened in mid-1992 after a three-year renovation.

The Catalog Room was renamed in 1994 for fashion designer Bill Blass, who gave $10 million to the NYPL. The Main Reading Room was closed in July 1997 for renovations designed by Davis Brody Bond. The restoration entailed cleaning and repainting the ceiling, cleaning the windows, refinishing the wood, and removing partitions within the room. Workers also replaced desk lamps and installed energy-efficient window panes. The space was renamed the Rose Main Reading Room, after the children of a benefactor who had given $15 million toward the renovation. The Reading Room reopened on November 16, 1998. The same year, the New York State government allocated funding for the Main Branch to install computers and other electronic devices. The Reading Room received new workstations, and the space was also redecorated to accommodate patrons' laptops. The bungalow in the Library's South Court was taken apart the same year.

=== 21st-century changes ===
==== 2000s: start of renovations ====
A four-story glass structure was erected on the site of the South Court, an enclosed courtyard on the Main Branch's south side, starting in the late 1990s. The structure cost $22.2 million and included a floor area of 42,220 square feet (3,922 m^{2}). Opened in 2002, the South Court structure was the first permanent above-ground addition to the Main Branch since its opening. The pop-up reading room in Bryant Park was re-established in summer 2003. The "room" contained 700 books and 300 periodicals. By 2004, streaks were already blackening the white marble and pollution and moisture were corroding the ornamental statuary. In December 2005, the Lionel Pincus and Princess Firyal Map Division space, with richly carved wood, marble, and metalwork, was restored.

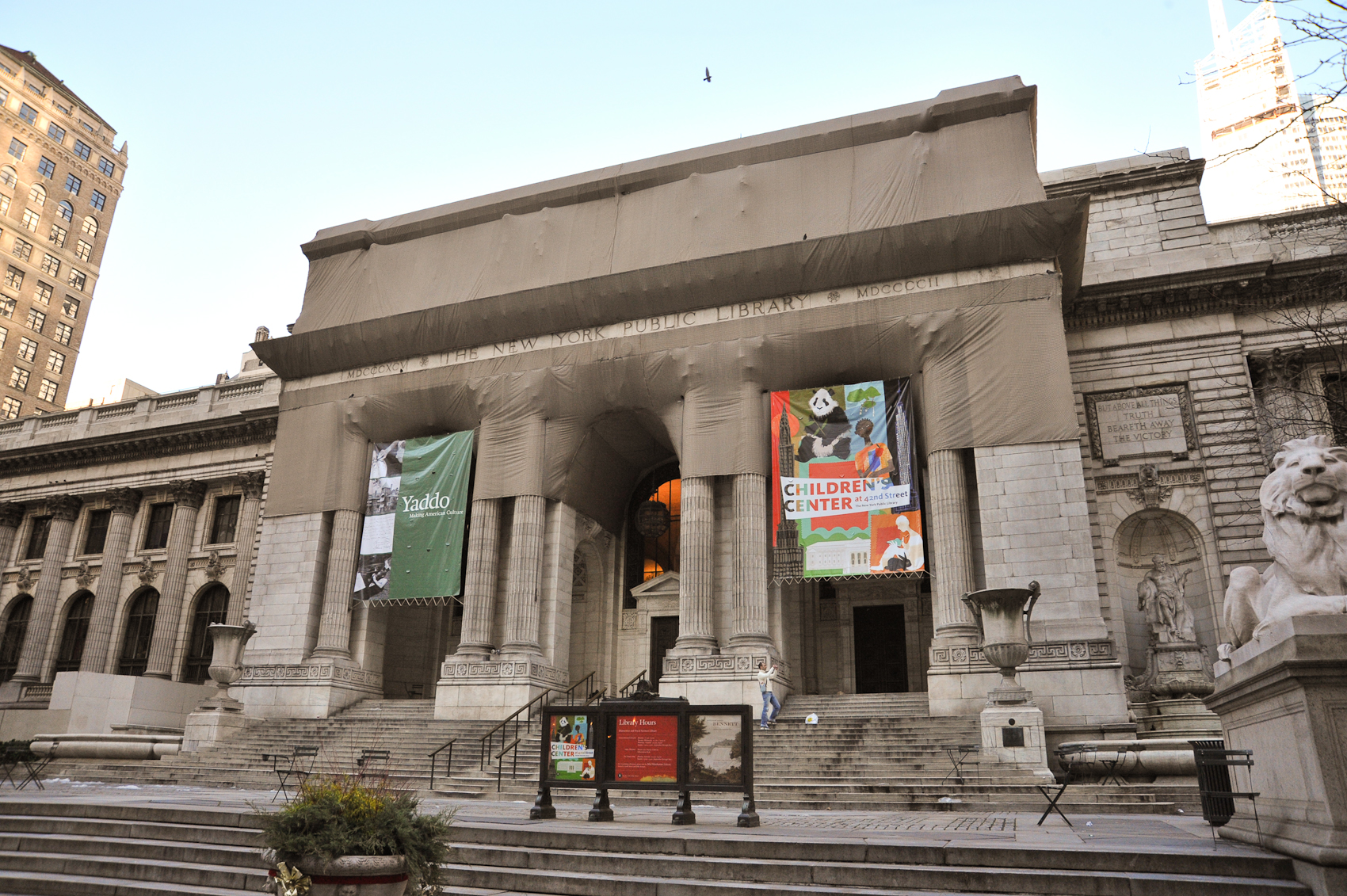
Restoration work on the building's facade, 2008

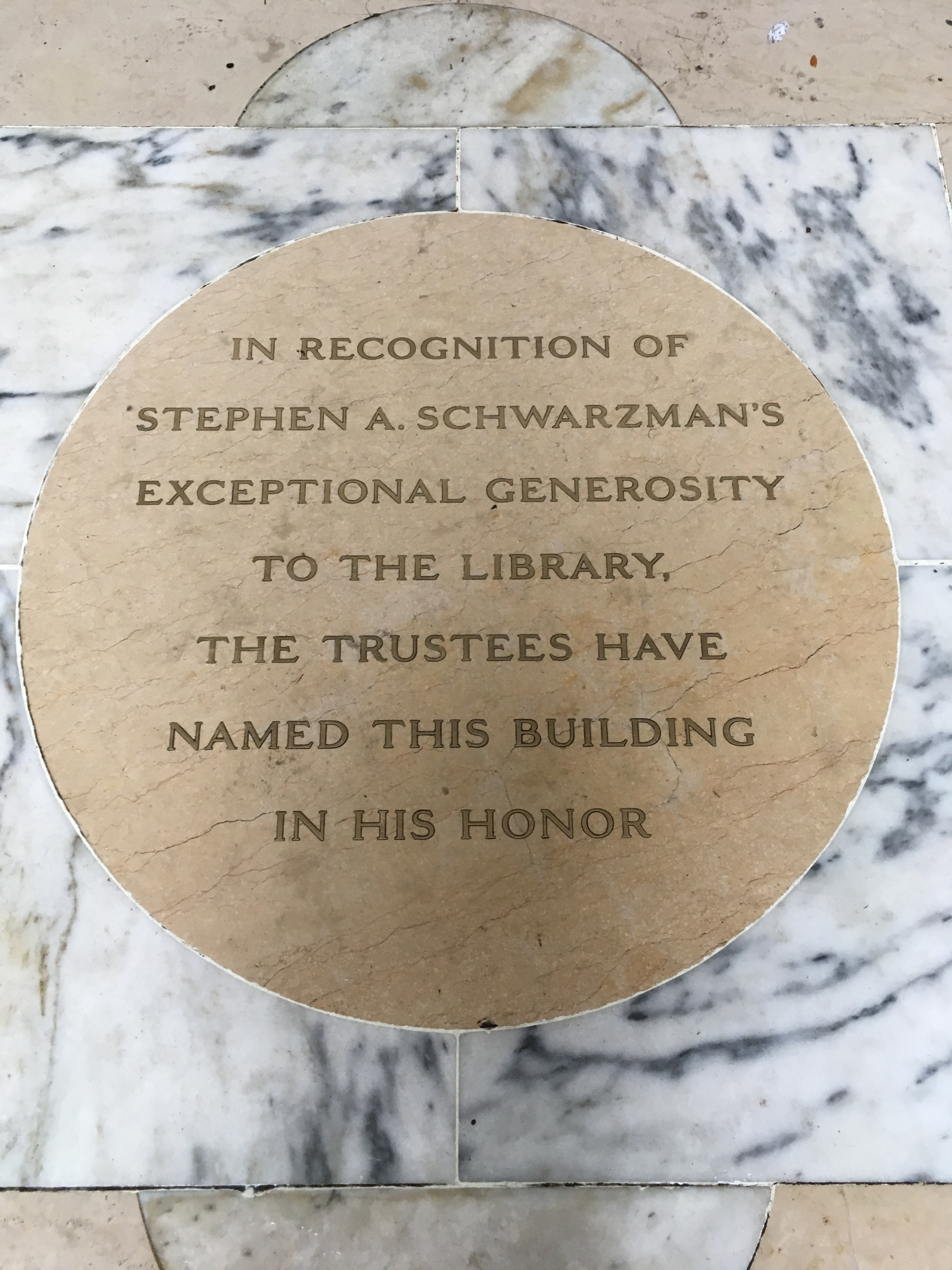
Plaque honoring Stephen A. Schwarzman's contributions

In 2007, the library announced that it would undertake a three-year, $50 million renovation of the building exterior, which had suffered damage from weathering and automobile exhaust. The marble structure and its sculptural elements were to be cleaned; three thousand cracks were to be repaired; and various components would be restored. All of the work was scheduled to be completed by the centennial in 2011. Library director Paul LeClerc said in 2007 that "my ambition is for this to be the building you simply must see in New York at nighttime because it is so beautiful and it is so important." By late 2007, library officials had not yet decided whether to try to restore damaged sculptural elements or just clean and "stabilize" them. Cleaning would be done either with lasers or by applying poultices and peeling them off.

The businessman Stephen A. Schwarzman donated $100 million toward the renovation and expansion of the building, and the library announced in April 2008 that the main branch building would be renamed in his honor. As a condition of the gift, Schwarzman's name had to be displayed at each public entrance. Later that year, British architect Norman Foster was chosen to design the Main Branch's renovation. To pay for the renovations, the New York Public Library was attempting to sell the Mid-Manhattan and Donnell branches, the latter of which had already found a buyer. Nicolai Ouroussoff, former architecture critic for The New York Times, opined that Foster's selection was "one of a string of shrewd decisions by the library that should put our minds at ease". Milrose Consultants, a building code and regulatory consulting firm, worked on code consulting and municipal filing services associated with the interior alterations and building system upgrades.

==== 2010s to present: the Central Library Plan and aftermath ====
By 2010, while renovations on the Main Branch were ongoing, the New York Public Library had cut back its staff and budget in other branches following the Great Recession of 2008. In 2012, a Central Library Plan was announced; the plan included closing the nearby Mid-Manhattan Library and Science, Industry and Business Library and turning the Main Branch into a circulating library. Over a million books would have been stored in a New Jersey warehouse shared with Princeton University and Columbia University. The plan was controversial; academics, writers, architects and civic leaders signed a letter of protest against the plan, and Princeton history professor Anthony Grafton wrote that the proposal would inconvenience many readers. After a six-year battle and two public interest lawsuits, the Central Library Plan was abandoned in May 2014. An $8 million gift from Abby and Howard Milstein helped fund the renovation of the second level of stacks beneath Bryant Park. The writer Scott Sherman said that, "in the end, elected officials in New York City had to save the NYPL from its own trustees."

In May 2014, one of the rosettes in the ceiling of the Rose Main Reading Room fell to the floor. The NYPL closed the Rose Main Reading Room and the Public Catalog Room for renovations. The $12 million restoration project included restoring the rosettes and supporting them with steel cables, as well as installing LED lamp fixtures. The NYPL commissioned EverGreene Architectural Arts to recreate the mural in the Bill Blass Public Catalog Room, which had been severely damaged during its 105-year history. The NYPL also replaced its historic chain-and-lift book conveyor system with a new delivery system using "book trains". The restored Rose Main Reading Room and Bill Blass Public Catalog Room reopened on October 5, 2016. Starting in August 2017, the Main Branch hosted an interim circulating library at 42nd Street, housing part of the Mid-Manhattan Branch's collection while that building was closed for renovations. The Mid-Manhattan Branch's collection of pictures was also temporarily relocated to the Main Branch until the circulating library reopened in 2020.

In November 2017, the New York Public Library board approved a $317 million master plan for the Main Branch, which would be the largest renovation in the branch's history. The plan, designed by architecture firms Mecanoo and Beyer Blinder Belle, would increase publicly available space by 20 percent, add a new entrance at 40th Street, create the Center for Research and Learning for high-school and college students, add elevator banks, and expand space for exhibitions and researchers. At the time of approval, $308 million of funds had been raised, and construction was expected to be completed in 2021. The renovations began in July 2018 with the start of construction on the Lenox and Astor Room, a scholar's center, on the second floor. The Landmarks Preservation Commission approved the 40th Street entrance with minor modifications in March 2019. That August, the NYPL announced that the lions outside the Main Branch's front entrance would be restored in September and October at a cost of $250,000. The Center for Research in the Humanities opened on the second floor in October 2019.

The NYPL began presenting the Polonsky Exhibition of The New York Public Library's Treasures, the first-ever permanent exhibition of valuable objects in the library system's collections, at the building in late 2021. The entrance on 40th Street opened to the public in June 2023, and the rest of the renovation, which included a public plaza, a cafe, new restrooms, an elevator, and a visitor center, was completed the next month. In November 2023, while the library was closed for Thanksgiving, protestors demonstrating for Palestine caused $75,000 in damage to the facade, amid a budget crisis for the NYPL.

== Divisions ==
There are nine divisions at the New York Public Library's Main Branch, of which eight are special collections.

=== General Research Division ===
The General Research Division is the main division of the Main Branch and the only one that is not a special collection. The division is based out of the Rose Main Reading Room and the Bill Blass Public Catalog Room. The division contains 43 million items in more than 430 languages.

=== Milstein Division of U.S. History, Local History and Genealogy ===
The Irma and Paul Milstein Division of U.S. History, Local History and Genealogy houses one of the largest publicly available genealogical collections in North America. Though the division contains many New York City-related documents, it also contains documents collected from towns, cities, counties, and states across the U.S., as well as genealogies from around the world. The division acquired the holdings of the New York Genealogical and Biographical Society in 2008.

=== Map Division ===
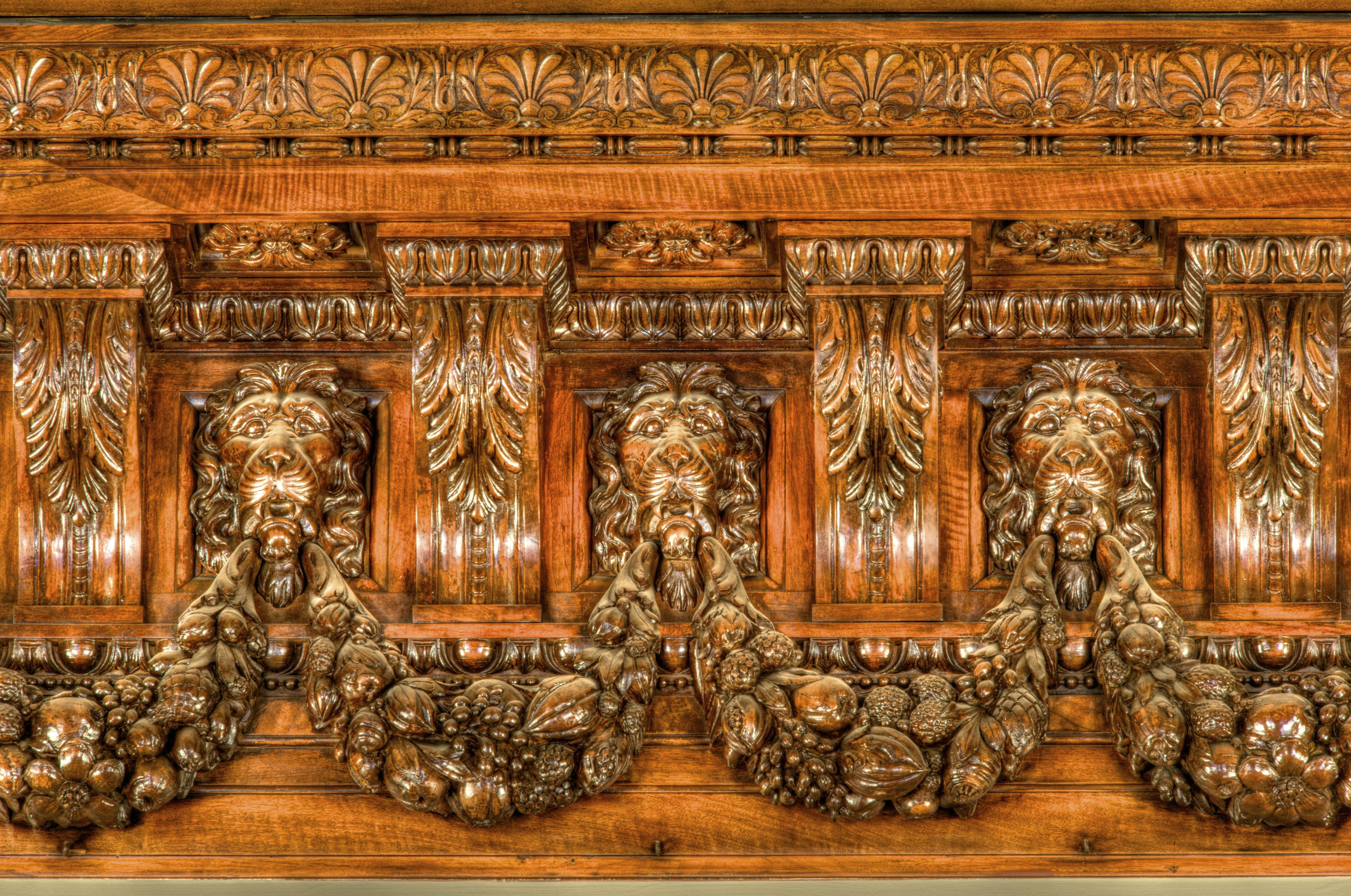
The ornate wooden cornice of the Map Division

The Lionel Pincus and Princess Firyal Map Division was created in 1898. It contains more than 20,000 atlases and 433,000 sheet maps, dating to as early as the 16th century. The collection includes maps on local, regional, national, and global scales as well as city maps, topographic maps, and maps in antiquarian and digitized formats.

=== Manuscripts and Archives Division ===
The Manuscripts and Archives Division comprises over 5,500 collections. These include, 700 cuneiform tablets, 160 illuminated manuscripts from the Middle Ages and Renaissance periods, notable people's and entities' papers, publishing archives, social and economics collections, and papers about the New York Public Library's history. The division supplements similar divisions at the Schomburg Center for Research in Black Culture in Harlem, and the New York Public Library for the Performing Arts at Lincoln Center.

=== Dorot Jewish Division ===
The Dorot Jewish Division contains documents about Jewish subjects and the Hebrew language. The division, founded in 1897, contains documents and books from the Astor and Lenox Libraries; the Aguilar Free Library; and the private collections of Leon Mandelstamm, Meyer Lehren, and Isaac Meyer. The division is named for the Dorot Foundation, who made a formal endowment for the Chief of Division in 1986.

=== Berg Collection of English and American Literature ===
The Henry W. and Albert A. Berg Collection of English and American Literature contains rare books, first editions, and manuscripts in English and American literature. The collection includes over 35,000 works from 400 individual authors. The collection was created in 1940 with a donation from Albert Berg in memory of his brother Henry, and was formally endowed in 1941. The initial collection comprised 3,500 books and pamphlets created by over 100 authors. An additional 15,000 works came from Owen D. Young, who donated his private collection to the library in 1941.

=== Pforzheimer Collection of Shelley and His Circle ===
The Carl H. Pforzheimer Collection of Shelley and His Circle is a collection of around 25,000 works from the English Romanticism genre, created in the 18th and 19th centuries. It was donated by the estate of oil financier Carl Pforzheimer in 1986. According to the New York Public Library's website, the collection contains works from English Romantic poet Percy Bysshe Shelley; Shelley's second wife Mary Wollstonecraft Shelley and her family members, including William Godwin, Mary Wollstonecraft, and Claire Clairmont; and other contemporaries including "Lord Byron, Teresa Guiccioli, Thomas Jefferson Hogg, Leigh Hunt, Thomas Love Peacock, Horace Smith, and Edward John Trelawny".

=== Rare Book Division ===
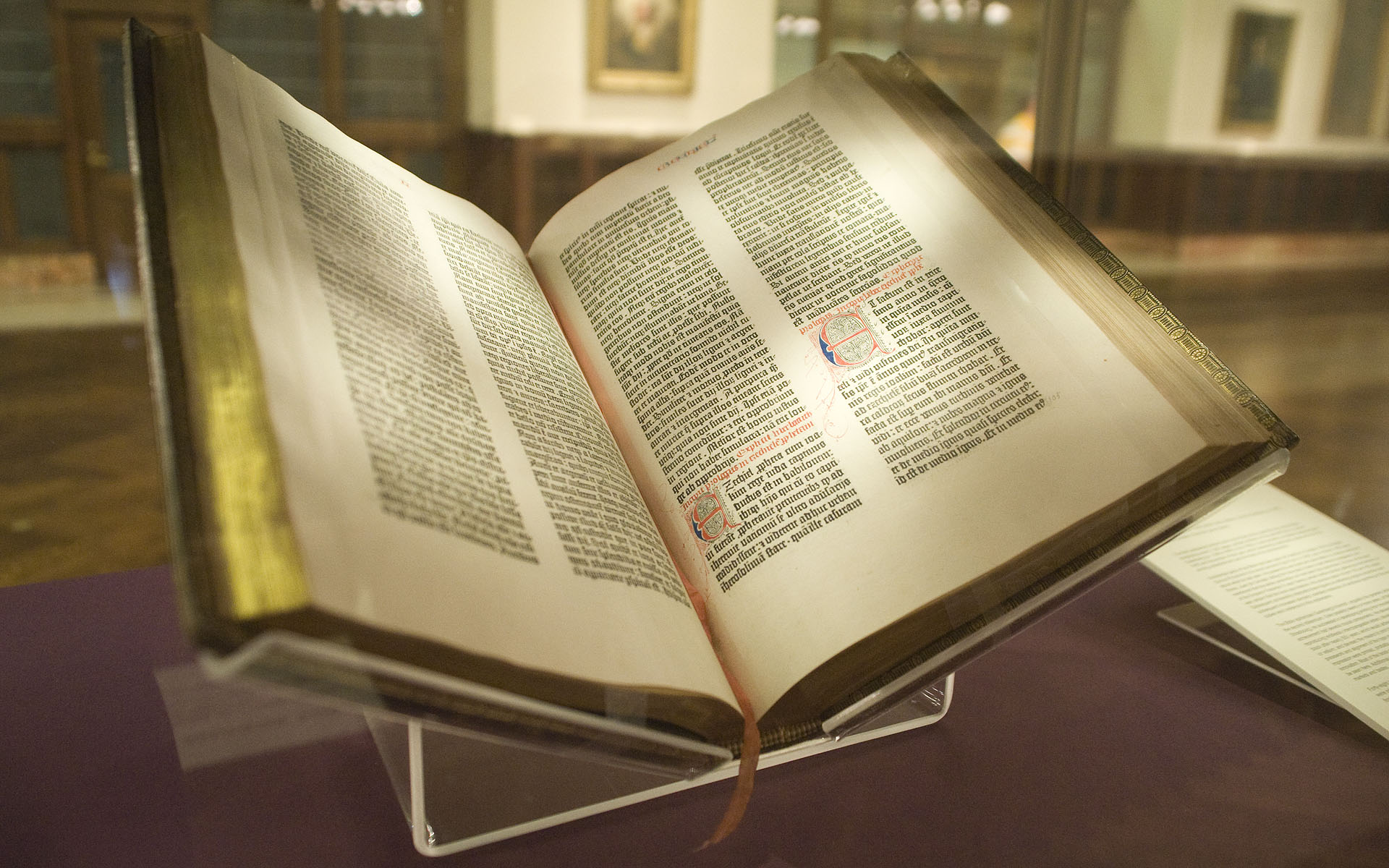
The Main Branch holds the Lenox Copy of the Gutenberg Bible, the first copy to be acquired by a United States citizen.

The Rare Book Division requires pre-registration for researchers before they are allowed to enter. The collection includes 800 incunable works published in Europe before 1501, Americana published before 1801, and American newspapers published before 1865, as well as over 20,000 broadsides, old atlases, and works about voyages. The division also contains rare Bibles, including the first Gutenberg Bible to be brought to the U.S., the first Native American language Bible, and the first Bible created in the U.S. In addition, it includes first editions and copies from notable writers, including William Shakespeare, copies of The Pilgrim's Progress printed before 1700, Voltaire's entire work, and Walt Whitman's personal copies of his own work. The division houses rare artifacts as well, such as the first book printed in North America and the first English-language book printed in the U.S.

=== Wallach Division of Art, Prints and Photographs ===
The Miriam and Ira D. Wallach Division of Art, Prints and Photographs was created by a gift of the Wallach family in 1987. The collection includes over one million works of art as well as 700,000 monographs and periodicals.

== Exterior ==
The New York Public Library's Main Branch measures 390 feet (120 m) on its north–south axis by 270 feet (82 m) on its west–east axis. The library is located on the east side of the block bounded by Fifth Avenue on the east, 40th Street on the south, Sixth Avenue on the west, and 42nd Street on the north. The north end of the building sits above entrances to the Fifth Avenue station of the New York City Subway, serving the 7 and <7> trains. The station was built as part of the Interborough Rapid Transit Company's Flushing Line, and was opened in 1926 with a ceremony at the Main Branch.

The marble on the library building is about three feet thick, and the structure is composed entirely of Vermont marble and brick. Most of the exterior of the building is made of white Vermont marble, which includes both perpendicular and parallel cuts. The lowest section of the walls is made of granite, and there are also bronze windows, doors, grilles, and fixtures. Tennessee marble was used for the library's flagpole pedestals, seats, and lion sculptures. During construction, the builders conducted quality checks on the marble, and 65 percent of the marble quarried for the Main Branch was rejected and used in other buildings such as Harvard Medical School. The exterior is composed of 20,000 blocks of stone, each of which is numbered. An elaborate cornice with sculpted figures wraps around the top of the structure's exterior. The massing of the library building was intended to highlight its primary public spaces. There is a gable roof above the public catalog room, which is on axis with the main entrance on Fifth Avenue, as well as a hip roof above the main reading room, which runs north–south near the western end of the building.

=== Fifth Avenue elevation ===
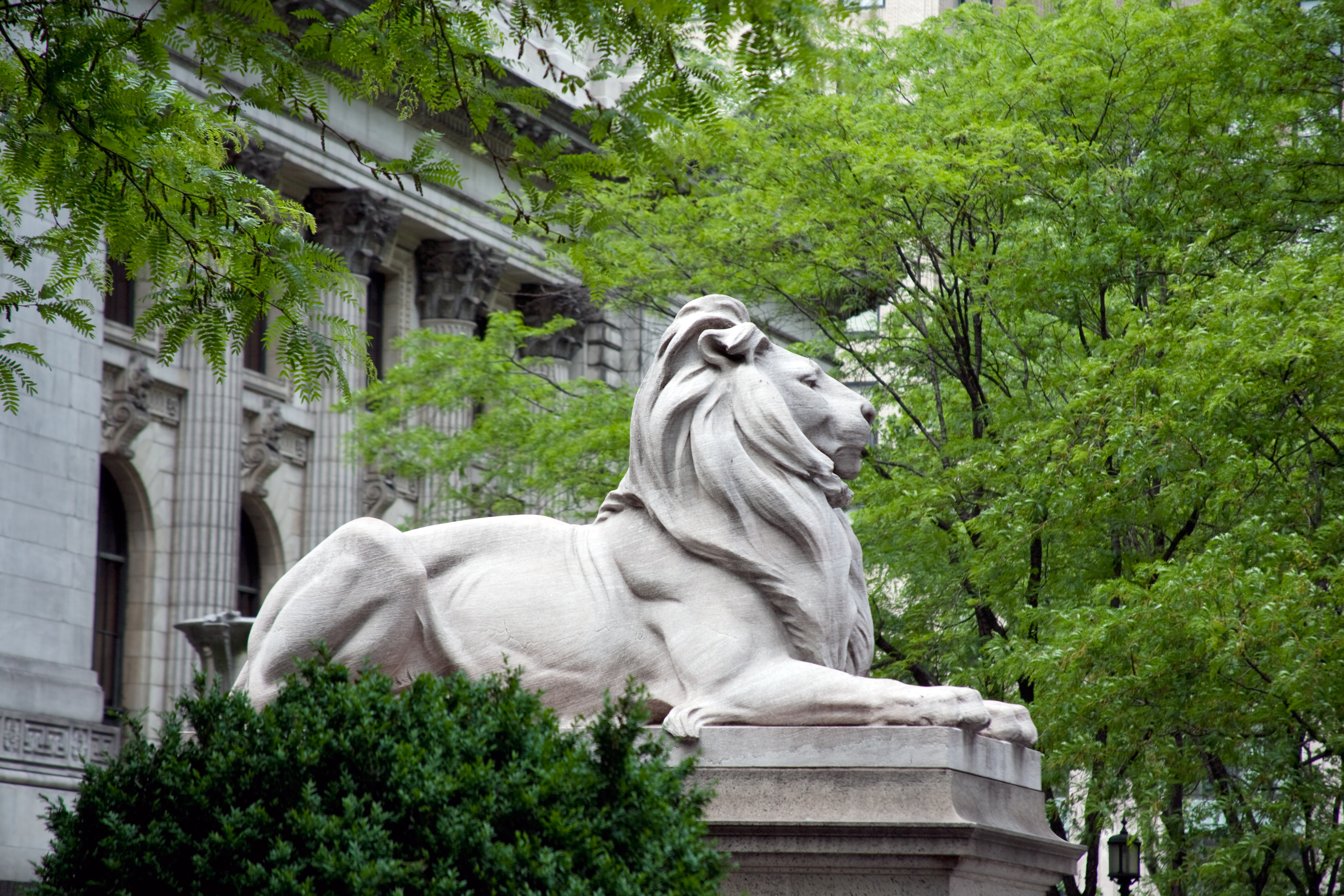
One of the lions at the main entrance to the New York Public Library

The Main Branch faces Fifth Avenue to the east; this comprises the primary elevation of the building. A terrace wraps along the Fifth Avenue elevation. The terrace is 90 feet (27 m) deep and contains a granite balustrade. The present design of the terrace dates to 1988, when it was resurfaced with granite, bluestone, and cobblestones. The terrace contains movable chairs and tables. Along the eastern edge of the terrace are two rows of Japanese locust trees.

The Fifth Avenue entrance is reached by a grand marble stairway extending west from the terrace at 41st Street. Two lion sculptures, made of Tennessee marble and sculpted by the Piccirilli Brothers based on a design by Edward Clark Potter, flank the stairway from 41st Street. According to one legend, the lions flank the steps so patrons could read "between the lions". They are a trademark of the New York Public Library, which uses a single stone lion as its logo. Their original names, "Leo Astor" and "Leo Lenox" (in honor of the library's founders) were transformed into Lord Astor and Lady Lenox (although both lions are male), and in the 1930s they were nicknamed "Patience" and "Fortitude" by Mayor Fiorello La Guardia, who chose the names because he felt that the citizens of New York would need to possess these qualities to see themselves through the Great Depression. Patience is on the south side, to the left of the entrance stairway, and Fortitude on the north, to the right. The lions were restored in 1975 and in 2007–2011, and they were restored once again in late 2019.

The Fifth Avenue pavilion consists of a portico with six Corinthian columns and three archways. The Corinthian columns are placed on pedestals with rosettes and Greek-fret molding. These columns support a marble attic with six 11-foot-high (3.4 m) allegorical sculptures designed by Paul Wayland Bartlett; the figures flank three carved plaques, one each for the Astor, Lenox, and Tilden foundations. The arches contain barrel vaults with the faces of the classical deities Juno, Minerva, and Mercury on their keystones. The faces initially all depicted Minerva, but Carrere and Hastings hired sculptor Francis Tonetti-Dozzi in 1909 to redo the outer two keystones. The archways lead to the first floor of the structure, which is one story above ground level. The arches contain bronze doors with marble frames and triangular pediments. Hastings had drawn up a new design for the portico in 1921, but this was never constructed. George Grey Barnard also designed pediments for sculptures to be installed above the main entrance, representing "Life" and "Painting and Sculpture". When the sculptures were erected in 1915, he unsuccessfully sued the installers for $50,000 because they did not fit with his vision.

On either side of the Fifth Avenue entrance pavilion, there are alcoves with sculptures of figures inside them, followed by five bays of windows. Each bay contains arched windows on the first floor and rectangular windows on the second floor, above which is an attic with a marble balustrade. According to architecture critic Henry Hope Reed Jr., the balustrade is similar to that at Versailles's Grand Trianon. The bays are separated by Corinthian columns. The alcoves on the Fifth Avenue facade contained figures sculpted by Frederic MacMonnies, representing beauty and wisdom. These figures sit above small fountains inside the alcoves. They were shut off from 1942 to 1957, and again from the 1980s to 2015. The outer ends of the facade are treated as end pavilions. Barnard designed pediments for the end pavilions, which represented the arts and history; they are slightly asymmetrical and resemble the pediment above the main entrance. The corner pavilions also contain rusticated quoins as well as stone piers.

=== Northern and southern elevations ===
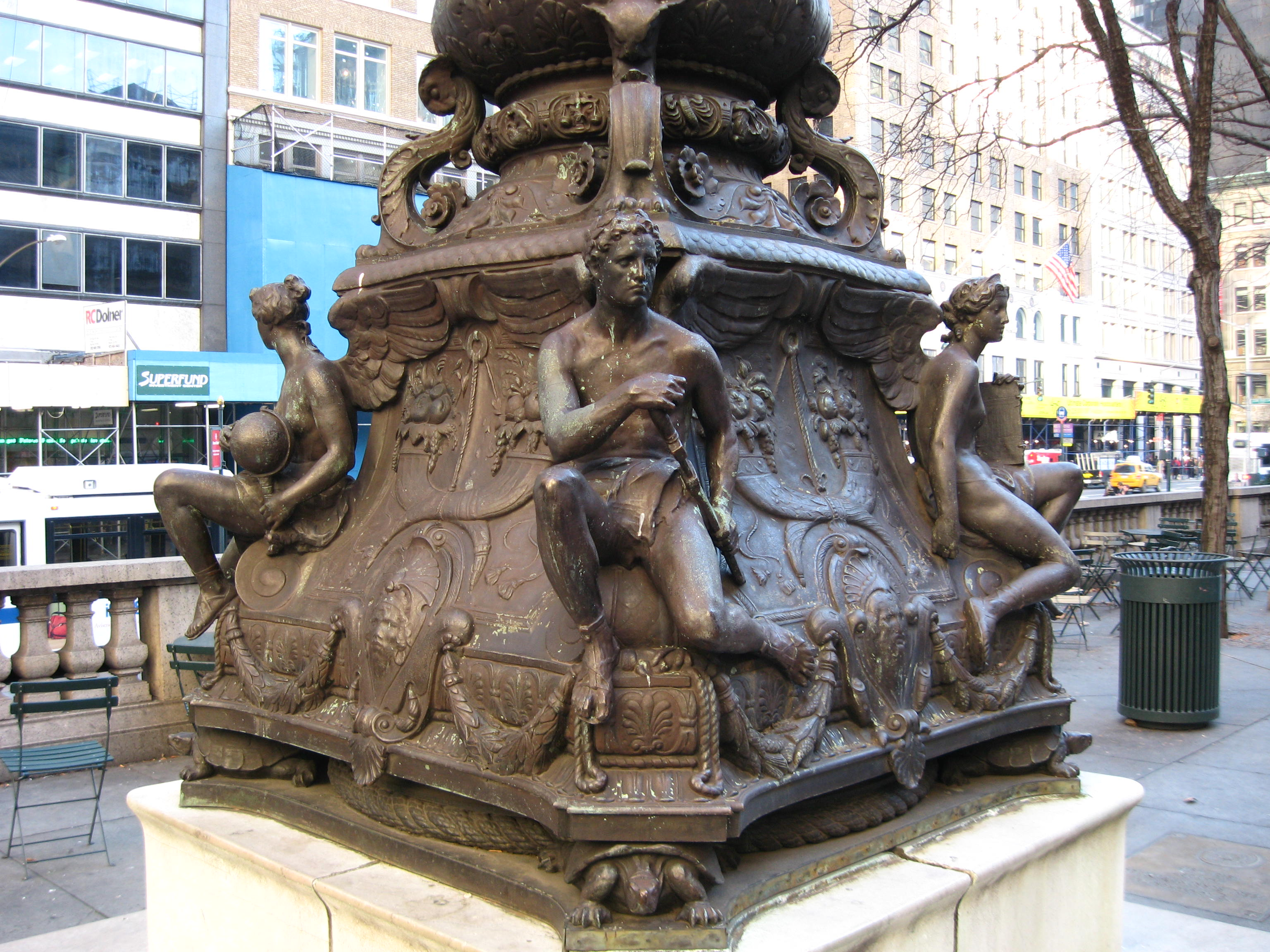
One of two bronze flagpole bases at the 42nd Street entrance, sculpted by Raffaele Menconi

The northern and southern facades of the building are located along 42nd and 40th Streets, respectively. The northern and southern elevations were treated as side elevations, and the windows on these elevations illuminate secondary spaces inside the library. Both elevations measure 11 bays wide and are nearly identical to each other. Cornices run above the northern and southern elevations, connecting the primary elevations on Fifth Avenue and Bryant Park. The northern side contains an entrance to the ground level, while the southern side was not built with a public entrance. The northern entrance is at the center of that elevation and is topped by a pediment. In 2023, a public entrance opened on the southern elevation, adjacent to a 2,250-square-foot (209 m^{2}) public plaza called the Marshall Rose Plaza.

The northern entrance is flanked by flagpoles whose sculpted bronze bases were designed in 1912 by Thomas Hastings. They were realized by the sculptor Raffaele Menconi, who often worked closely with New York architects of the Beaux-Arts generation. Each of the bronze bases is supported by four tortoises and contains cast-bronze ornament, in addition to personifications of conquest, civilization, discovery, and navigation. The bronzes were cast at Tiffany Studios in Long Island City and are dedicated to former New York City mayor John Purroy Mitchel.

The building contained an enclosed courtyard on its south side called the South Court, measuring 80 by 80 feet (24 by 24 m). It was originally a drop-off location for horse carriages. The court contained a marble fountain and horse trough, with a bungalow erected in 1919 as an employees' break area. The fountain was destroyed in 1950 and replaced with a parking lot, and the bungalow was taken apart in 1998. A six-story glass structure was erected on the site of the South Court, opening in 2002. The current structure measures 73 by 73 feet (22 by 22 m) and is connected to the rest of the library building via glass bridges. Below the South Court structure is a 174-seat auditorium, accessed via a glass staircase cut into the original basement. The first story contains the Bartos Education Center, with two classrooms and an orientation theater. The second through fourth floors contain offices, and the fourth floor also contains a quiet room and staff lounge.

=== Bryant Park elevation ===
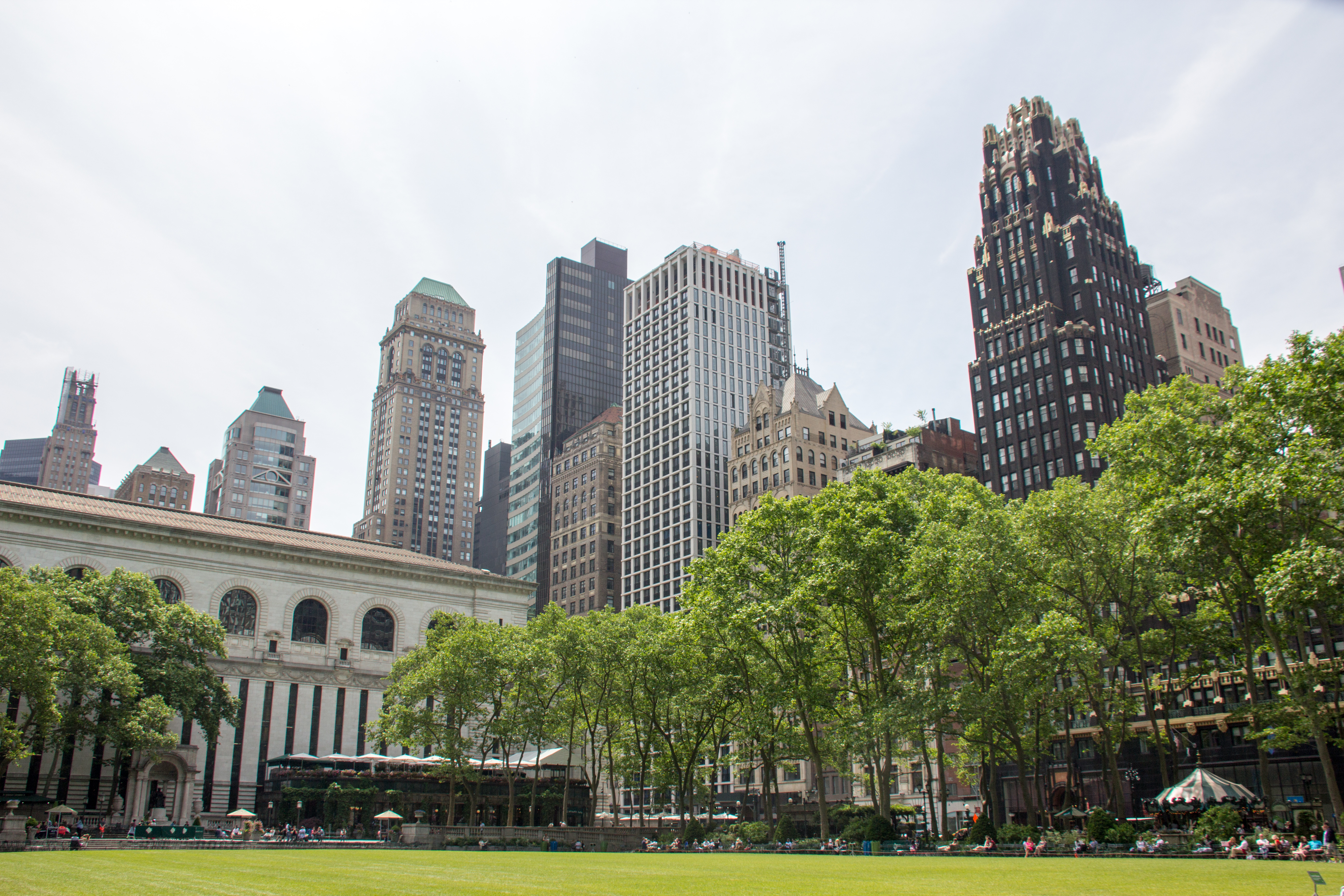
The library's west side (bottom left) faces Bryant Park

The west side, which faces Bryant Park, contains narrow vertical windows that illuminate the stacks inside the Main Branch. The narrow windows allow light to enter the stacks below the third-floor Rose Main Reading Room. Above the tall windows, near the top of the facade, are nine large arched windows that illuminate the reading room itself. The presence of the narrow windows may have been intended to evoke the appearance of a flat colonnade. Next to the center of the facade is a statue of William Cullen Bryant, sculpted by Herbert Adams; the statue is placed on a plinth and sheltered by a half-dome supported by Doric columns.

Near the top of the facade are eight doorways with pediments, which were part of the original design. Although NYPL staff were unable to ascertain why these doorways were built, they may have been built in anticipation of an unbuilt expansion of the stacks toward Bryant Park. There is a projecting cornice and a hip roof above the center section of the stacks and reading room. The northern and southern ends of the Bryant Park elevation both contain pavilions, similar to those on Fifth Avenue.

== Interior ==
The interior of the Main Branch consists of four publicly accessible floors: the ground level and the first through third floors. There is a corridor along the eastern side of each floor, which runs the length of the building from north to south. The building also contains two light courts, measuring three by three bays wide, which separate each floor into four-bay-wide sections to the west and east. Originally, the interior collectively contained more than 200 rooms, and the building had a footprint of 115,000 square feet (10,700 m^{2}). Generally, lower room numbers are located on the south side of the building, and higher room numbers on the north side. Many spaces contain quarry-tile floors; walls with shelves or wood paneling; and molded plaster ceilings. The interior contains ornate detail from Carrère and Hastings, such as motifs of lions, and the decorative scheme extended to such minute details as doorknobs and wastebaskets.

There is a pair of public stairways on the north side of the building, which lead between the ground and third floors. The stairs share landings in the middle of each flight, allowing visitors to switch between staircases. The stairways contain vaulted ceilings made of Vermont marble; they are separated by solid marble floors, except at the landings, where there are square archways. These stairways may have been influenced by the design of the Louvre's Henry II Wing. Another stair and elevator are within the south wing adjacent to Marshall Rose Plaza.

The cellar, which is not open to the public, was initially used as a mechanical plant and contains remnants of the original Croton Reservoir. The western side of the building, from the cellar to the second floor, contains part of the Main Branch's storage stacks. Supplementing the Main Reading Room on the third floor, there are 21 other reading rooms in the Main Branch, including a ground-floor room with a cast-iron ceiling. There were originally 1,760 seats in all of the reading rooms combined, of which 768 were located in the Main Reading Room.

=== Ground floor ===
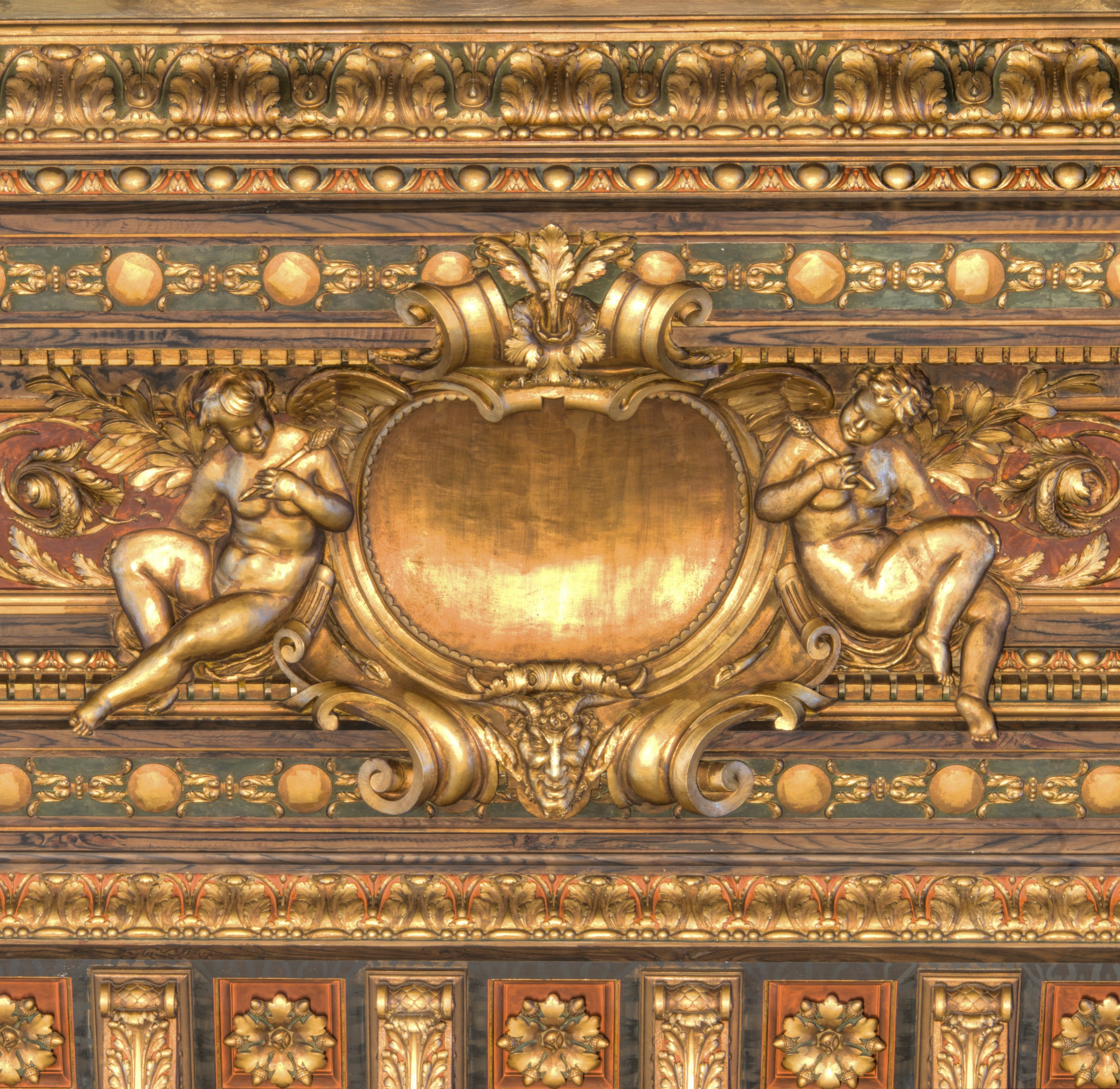
Detailing in the Public Catalog Room

The ground floor contains the entrance to 42nd Street. Originally it contained a coat-check, circulating library, newspaper room, and children's-book room. There were also spaces for telephones, a "library-school office", and a "travelling-library office". The former newspaper room in room 78 became the children's-book room, and the former children's-book room in room 81 is not open to the public. There is also a 3,600-square-foot (330 m^{2}) visitor center with exhibits in English, Spanish, and Chinese, the city's three most frequently spoken languages.

Room 80 operated as the circulating library from 1911 to 1981. It measures 80 by 80 feet (24 by 24 m) across. The room is placed at the center of the building, but its ground-floor location indicates that the library's trustees did not see the circulating library as an important part of the building's plan. The glass ceiling measures 30 feet (9.1 m) tall and is supported by four iron arches; it was covered by a dropped ceiling for much of the mid-20th century. Since 1987, room 80 has been the Bartos Forum, a 400-seat lecture room. Most of the Bartos Forum's original design remains in place, but the floors have been covered with carpets and the perimeter skylights have been sealed.

=== First floor ===
Above the ground floor is the first floor. The staircase entrance from Fifth Avenue opens up into the first-floor lobby, known as Astor Hall. This floor contains the Picture Collection (room 100), Wallace Periodical Room (room 108), and Jewish Division (room 111, former Periodicals Room) on the south side. On the north side are the Milstein Division (room 121, former Patents Room), Milstein Microforms (room 119), and Map Division (room 117). The Wachenheim Gallery, the library shop, the Bartos Education Center, and the Gottesman Hall (room 111, former Exhibition Room) are located in rooms that open into Astor Hall. The first floor also formerly contained various supervisors' offices, a library for the blind, and a technology room. The north–south corridor extends the entire width of the first floor, with large windows overlooking the street at either end; the ceiling was painted to resemble carved wood.

==== Astor Hall ====
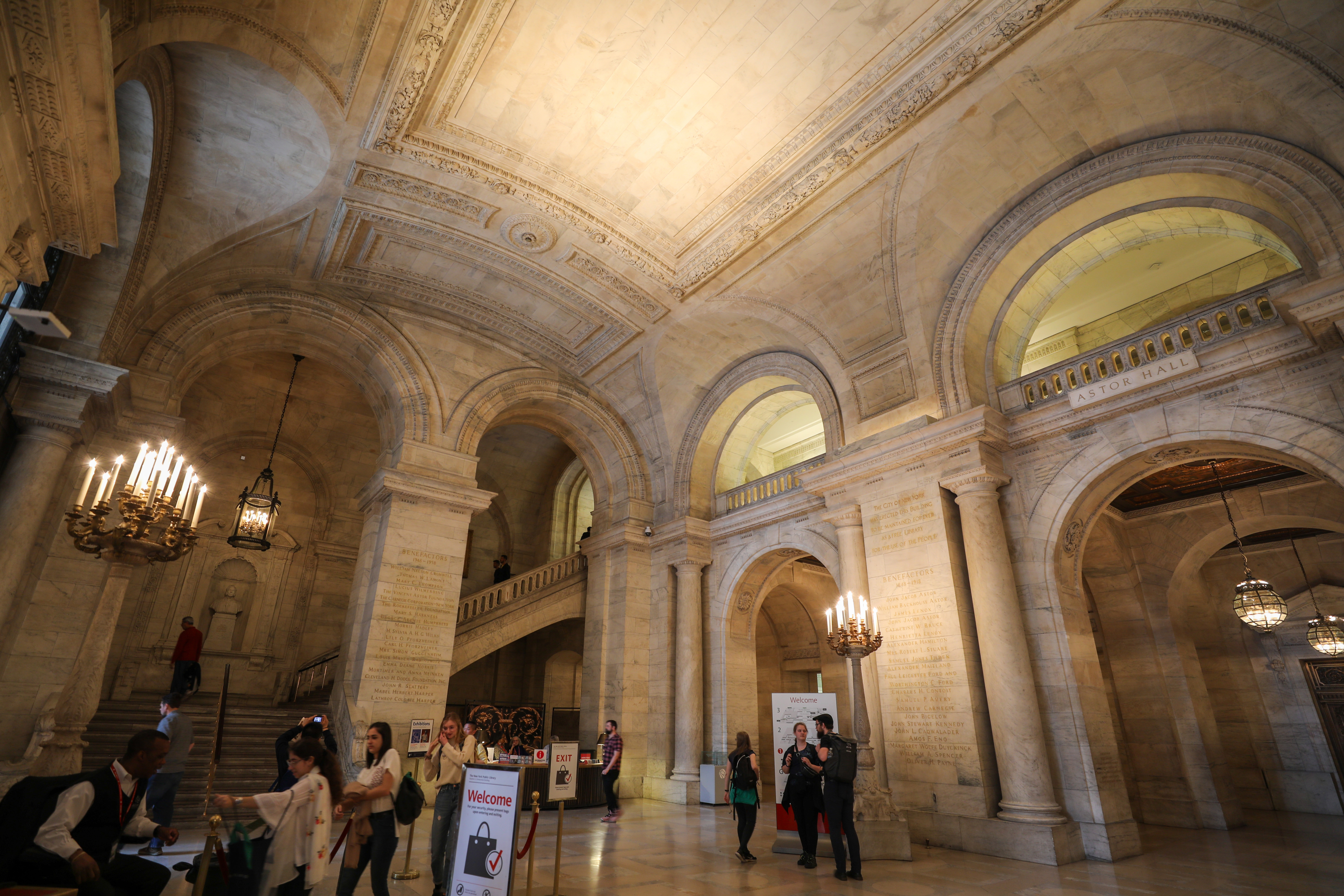
Astor Hall, on the first floor

Astor Hall, the first-floor lobby, is reached from the portico at the top of the Fifth Avenue stairs. The hall measures 70 by 44 feet (21 by 13 m), spanning three north–south bays and two west–east bays. The walls and ceiling are clad in Vermont marble. The ceiling is a 34-foot-high (10 m) shallow barrel vault, decorated with rectangular molded frames that consist of various motifs. Although the ceiling was intended to be a self-supporting structure, it is reinforced by a layer of concrete below the second floor. The pillars on the west and east walls are topped by egg-and-dart moldings, and there are marble candelabras next to these walls. There are arched openings at the top of the western wall, which support the ceiling, underneath which are archways leading to the first-floor rooms. The north and south walls contain piers. The names of major donors are inscribed on the pillars.

There are two grand marble staircases on the north and south walls. The staircases ascend several steps away from the hall before turning 90 degrees westward at a landing and ascending parallel to each other toward the second floor, behind the piers on the north and south walls. There are bronze busts of Carrère and Hastings, created in 1940 and 1935 respectively, at the landings of the stairways. The Carrère bust is near the south (left) stair, while the Hastings bust is near the north (right) stair. At the second floor, a mezzanine level overlooks the west side of the lobby, behind the arches. Another pair of staircases continues to the McGraw Rotunda on the third floor. Each staircase passes through another landing, which has a domed ceiling and a hanging chandelier.

==== Other spaces ====
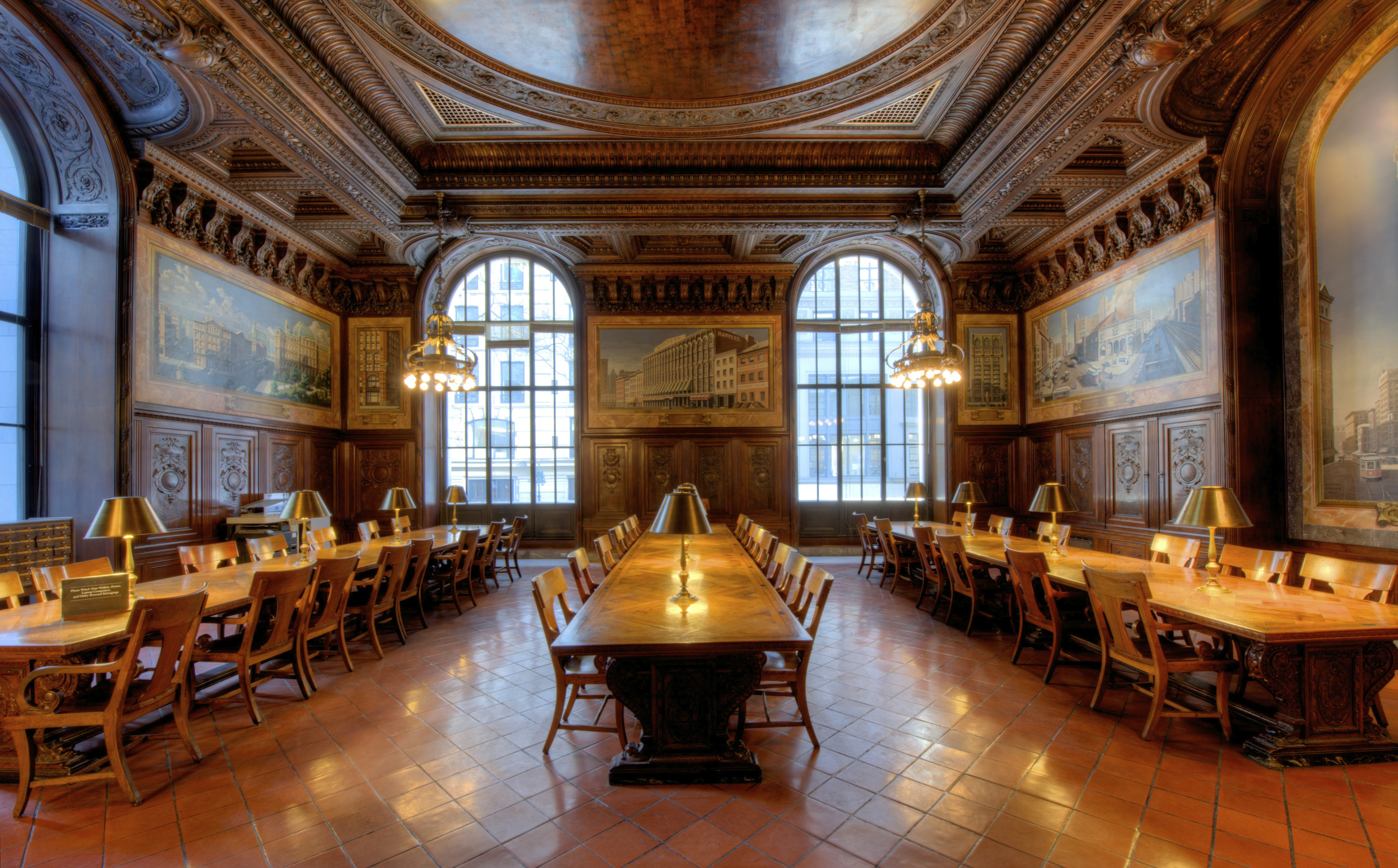
Interior of the Wallace Periodical Room

The Wallace Periodical Room in room 108 has been named for Reader's Digest founder DeWitt Wallace since 1983. It consists of current issues from 200 periodicals and 22 newspapers. The current design of the room dates from a renovation in the 1980s. The Periodical Room contains 13 murals of scenes from the history of New York City, which were designed by Richard Haas, The original design included cast-iron radiators, which were replaced with an air-circulation system under the windows. In addition, the room contains bronze chandeliers and sculptured ceilings.

Behind Astor Hall's information desk is the Gottesman Exhibition Hall. It served as the Main Branch's primary display area from 1911 to 1942 and was subsequently divided into offices. The space reopened in 1984. The Gottesman Exhibition Hall is made of Vermont marble and is accessed by large bronze or wrought-iron doors. The room measures 83 by 77 feet (25 by 23 m) across and 18 feet (5.5 m) high. The room contains Vermont marble pilasters and columns, as well as bronze and leaded glass chandeliers hanging from a carved-oak ceiling. The ceiling largely contains sunken panels with various Renaissance-style decorations, but the outer section of the ceiling has octagonal coffers. The floor includes a grid of circles and rhombuses. Besides Gottesman Hall, There are two other display areas on the first floor: the Wachenheim Gallery and the Celeste G. and Mahnaz I. Bartos Exhibition Gallery.

=== Second floor ===
The second floor contains the Jill Kupin Rose Gallery, which contains ongoing exhibitions. This floor contains several small rooms extending to the north, west, and south. One of these is the Wachenheim Trustees' Room, which contains wood paneling, parquet floors, and a fireplace made of white marble. Originally, this level contained director's and assistant director's offices; the Slavonic, Jewish, and Oriental Collections; and rooms for science, economics and sociology, and public documents. The former science room at room 225 is now the Cullman Center, while room 228, the former economics and sociology room, has been split into two rooms. As on the first floor, the second floor's north–south corridor extends the entire width of the floor, but the ceiling was made of plaster to save money.

=== Third floor ===
The McGraw Rotunda is on the east side of the building's third floor. The Print Gallery extends south from the rotunda; one publicly accessible room, the Wallach Division, is adjacent to the gallery. Similarly, the Stokes Gallery extends northward, with the Berg and Pforzheimer Collections branching off of it. The Salomon Room branches off the McGraw Rotunda to the east. To the west is the Bill Blass Public Catalog Room, which leads into the large Rose Main Reading Room. Unlike on the first and second stories, the main north–south corridor does not span the entire length of the third floor, as there are offices on either end.

==== McGraw Rotunda ====
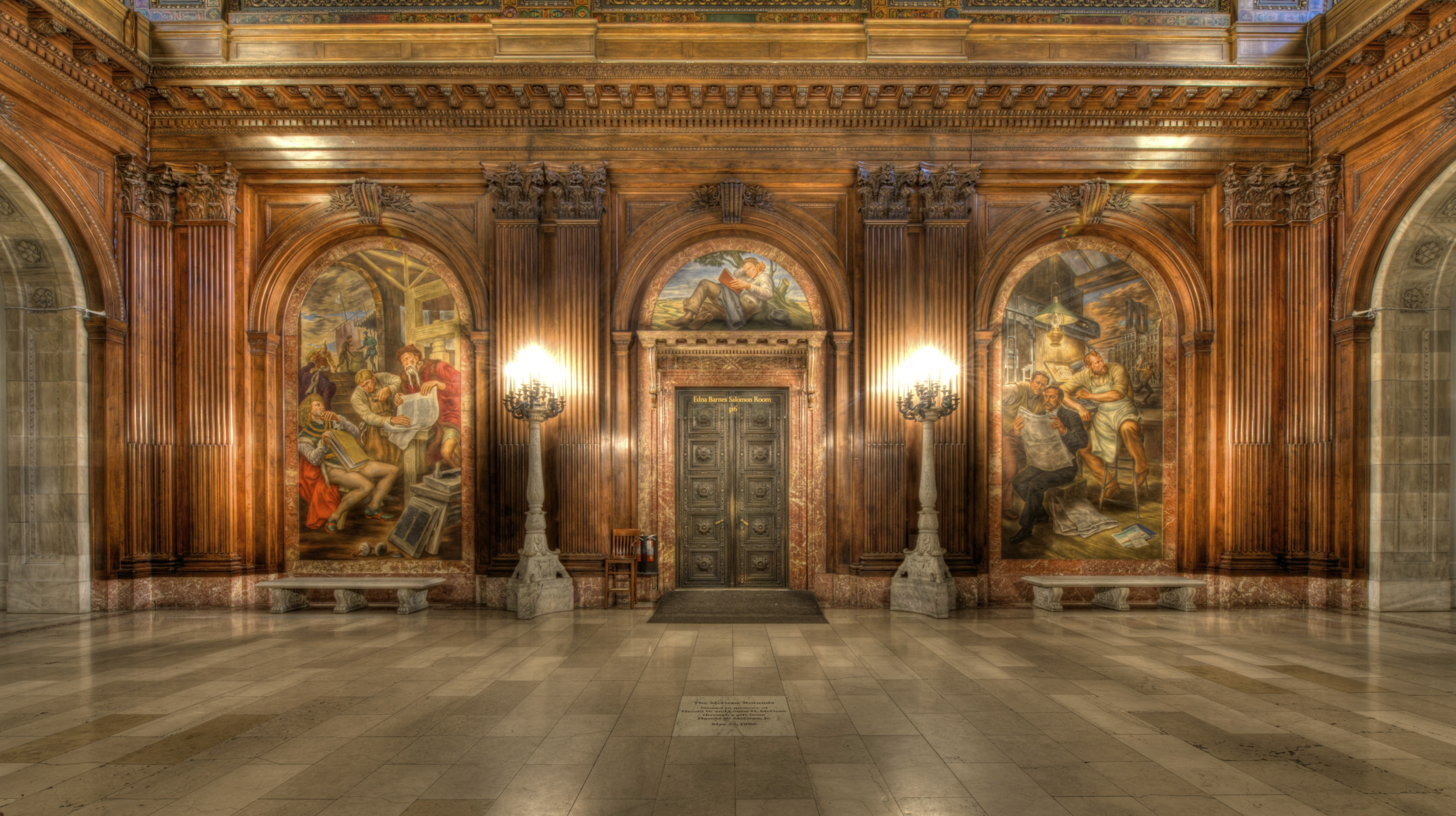
The McGraw Rotunda contains numerous murals by Edward Laning.

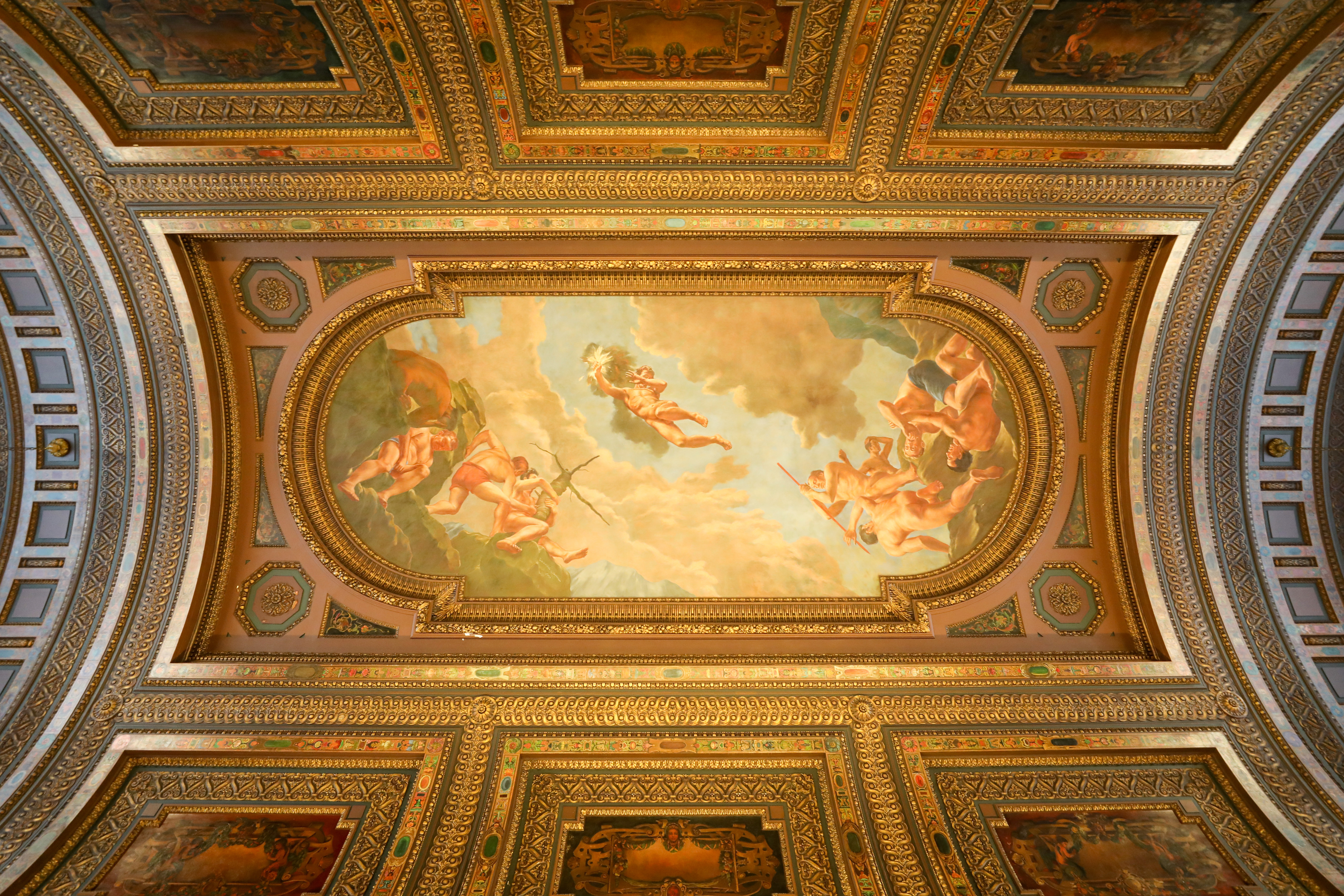
Laning's ceiling mural depicts Prometheus.

The McGraw Rotunda (formerly Central Hall), despite its name, is a rectangular barrel-vaulted space. The rotunda measures three bays wide from north to south and two bays wide from west to east. On the north and south walls, the western bay is occupied by the main corridor, while the eastern bay contains stairs from Astor Hall. The Public Catalog Room is to the west, and the Salomon Room is to the east. The entrances to both rooms are flanked by freestanding marble pedestals; the Salomon Room also contains a pair of bronze double doors with carved panels. The floors are made of Hauteville and Gray Siena marble. The rotunda's walls contain red marble bases with dark wood piers, topped by a Corinthian entablature with dentils and modillions. The piers support a plaster or stucco barrel vault. On the north and south ends of the barrel vault are glazed semicircular windows. There are alcoves on the side walls, supported by columns with Corinthian capitals, which were intended to contain murals.

The rotunda contains a set of panels painted by Edward Laning in the early 1940s as part of a WPA project. The work includes four large panels, two lunettes above doorways to the Public Catalog and Salomon Rooms, and a ceiling mural painted on the barrel vault. The four panels are located on the east and west walls and depict the development of the written word. The lunette above the Public Catalog Room's doorway is "Learning to Read", and the lunette about the Salomon Room's doorway is "The Student". The ceiling mural is called "Prometheus Bringing Fire to Men". The four panels and two lunettes were completed in 1940, and the ceiling mural was completed in 1942.

==== Rose Main Reading Room ====
The Main Branch's Deborah, Jonathan F. P., Samuel Priest, and Adam R. Rose Main Reading Room, officially Room 315 and commonly known as the Rose Main Reading Room, is located on the third floor of the Main Branch. The room is 78 by 297 feet (24 by 91 m) with a ceiling measuring about 52 feet high. Characterized by Robert A. M. Stern as one of the United States' largest column-free rooms, it is nearly as large as the Main Concourse at Grand Central Terminal. It was originally described as being in the Renaissance architectural style, but Matthew Postal described the room as having a Beaux-Arts design. Half of the space was used as an office and service center prior to the late 1990s. The Main Reading Room was renovated and renamed for the Rose family in 1998–1999; and further renovations to its ceiling were completed in 2016. The room became a New York City designated landmark in 2017.

The room is separated into two sections of equal size by a book-delivery desk. The desk is made of oak and is covered by a canopy, with arches held up by Tuscan columns. The north hall leads to the Manuscripts and Archives Reading Room, while the south hall leads to the Art and Architecture Reading Room, both of which are designed in a similar style to the main room. Picture taking is only allowed in a small section of the south hall. The doorways into the Main Reading Room contain large round pediments, which contrast with the smaller triangular pediments in the branch's other reading rooms. There is intricate detail on the room's smaller metalwork, such as doorknobs and hinges. The floors of the Main Reading Room and the connected Catalog Room are composed of red tiles, with marble pavers set in between the tiles, which indicate how the furniture should be arranged. The marble pavers demarcate the boundaries of the aisles.

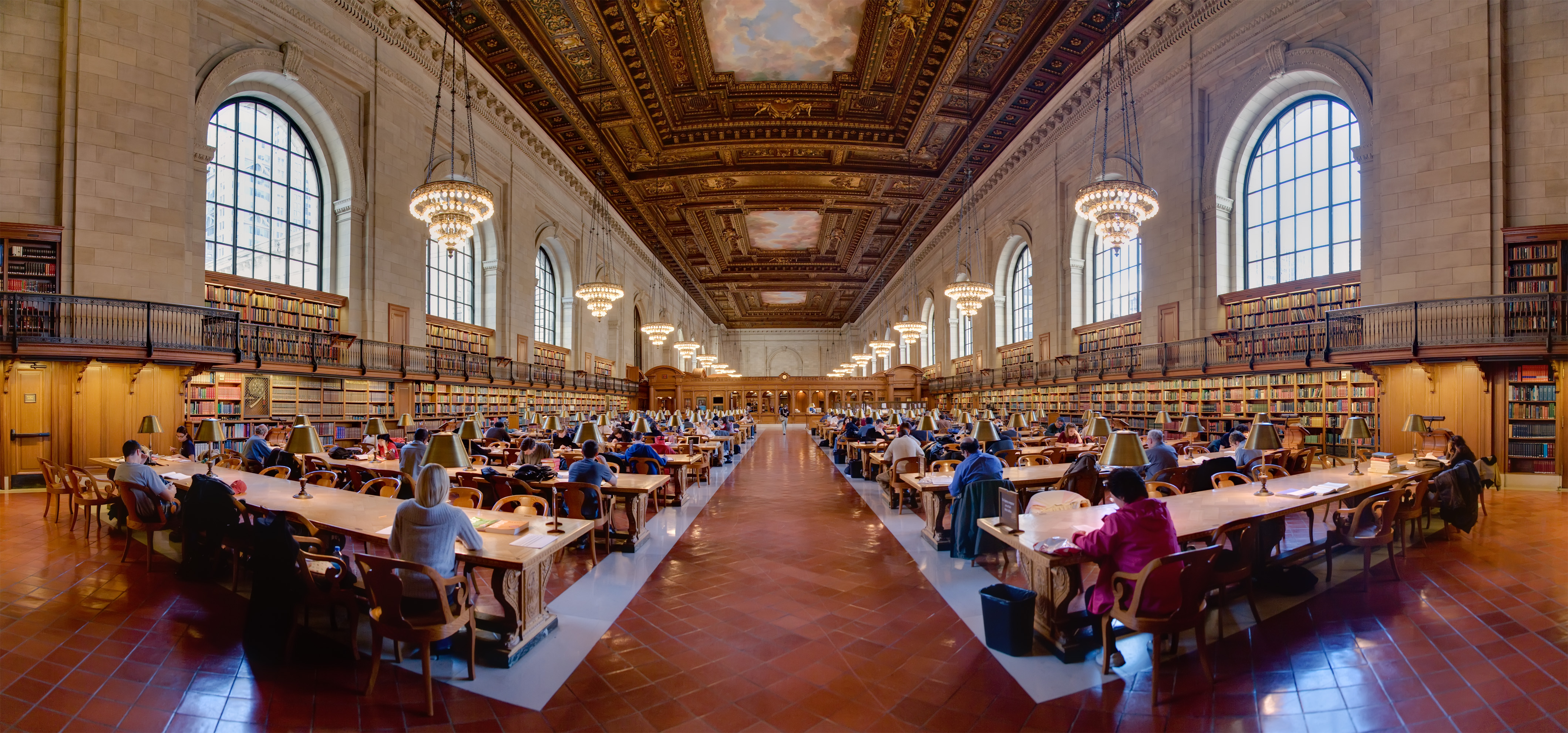
The Rose Main Reading Room, facing south

The Main Reading Room is furnished with low wooden tables and chairs. There are two arrays of tables in each hall, separated by a wide aisle; each table has four brass lamps. The tables each measure 23 by 4 feet (7.0 by 1.2 m). Originally, there were 768 seats, but this was reduced to 490 in the late 20th century. The seating capacity has since been increased to 624 or 636. Each spot at each table is assigned a number. The room is also equipped with desktop computers providing access to library collections and the Internet, as well as docking facilities for laptops. The NYPL installed 48 desktop computers near the central book-delivery desk. Thirty of the room's forty-two wooden tables have power outlets, while twelve of the tables have no outlets and are intended only for reading. Readers may fill out forms requesting books brought to them from the library's closed stacks, which are delivered to the indicated seat numbers.

Surrounding the room are thousands of reference works, which may be taken off the open shelves along the room's main and balcony levels. At the time of the library's opening, there were about 25,000 freely accessible reference works on the shelves. There are three levels of bookshelves: two on the main floor beneath the balcony, and one on the balcony. Above the top level of shelves is a duct carrying wiring and cables for the room.

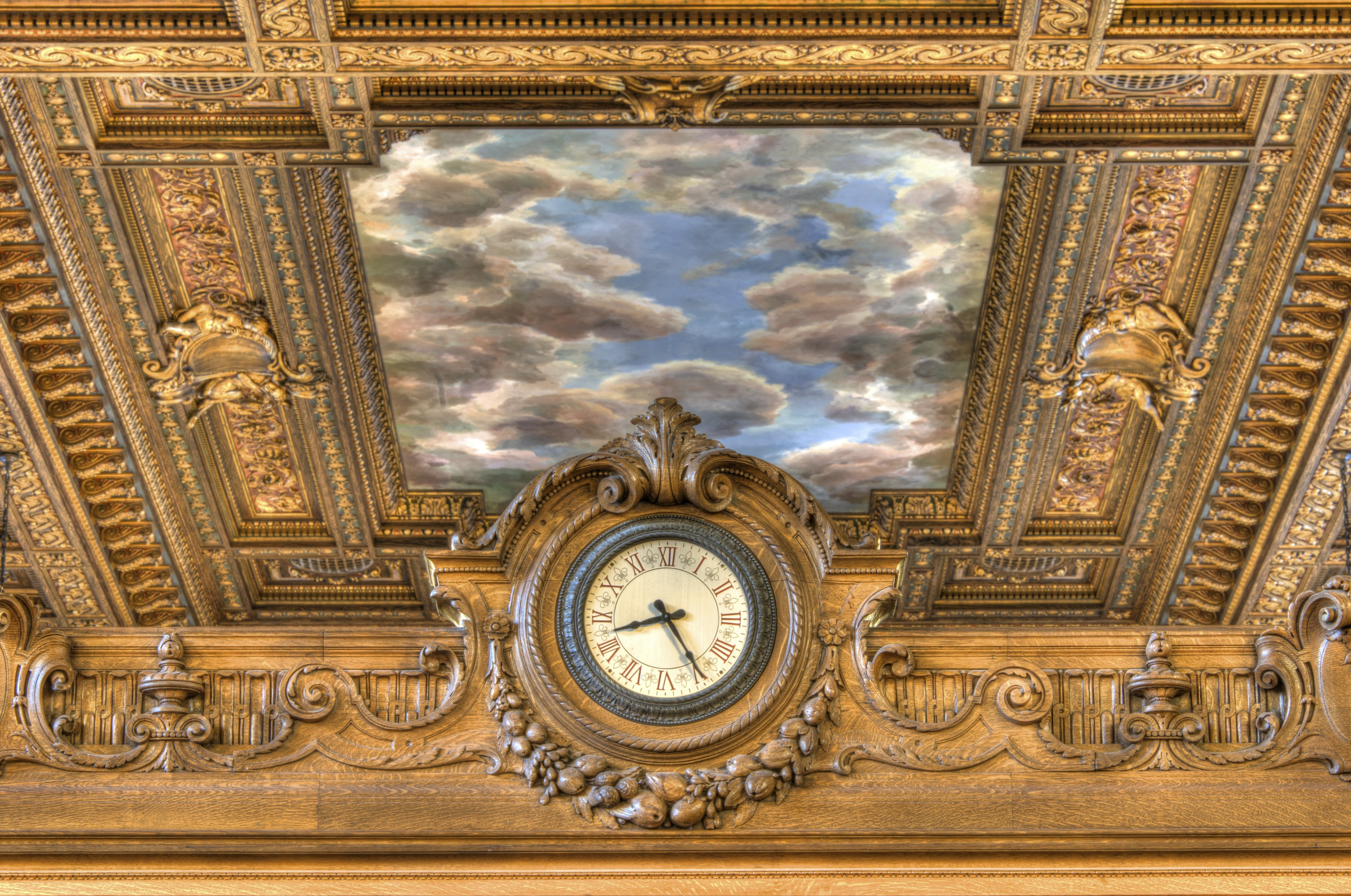
The ornate decorated ceiling of the Rose Main Reading Room

The walls are made of Caen stone and are designed to resemble limestone. Massive windows and grand chandeliers illuminate the space. There are eighteen grand archways, of which fifteen contain windows: nine face Bryant Park to the west, and six face east. The other three archways form a wall with the Public Catalog Room to its east, and the middle archway also contains windows that face into the Catalog Room. Each window contains low emissivity glass. There are two rows of nine chandeliers in the Main Reading Room, decorated with such details as satyr masks and acanthus leaves. These were originally fitted with incandescent light bulbs, an innovation at the time of the library's opening, and were powered by the library's own power plant. The lights on the chandeliers are arranged like an inverted cone, with four tiers of light bulbs.

The plaster ceiling is supported on wire mesh, since there are no columns within the room. The ceiling is painted to emulate gilded wood, with moldings of classical and figurative details. The Klee-Thomson Company plastered the ceiling. According to Matthew Postal, the moldings include "scroll cartouches bordered by cherubs, nude female figures with wings, cherub heads, satyr masks, vases of fruit, foliate moldings, and disguised ventilation grilles." The moldings frame a three-part mural, created by James Wall Finn and completed in 1911. Though no clear photographs exist of the mural's original appearance, the mural in its present incarnation depicts clouds and sky. When the ceiling was restored in 1998, the original mural was deemed to be unsalvageable, and Yohannes Aynalem instead painted a reproduction. The ceiling was restored again from 2014 to 2016. Heating and ventilation grilles are embedded within the walls and ceiling.

==== Public Catalog Room ====
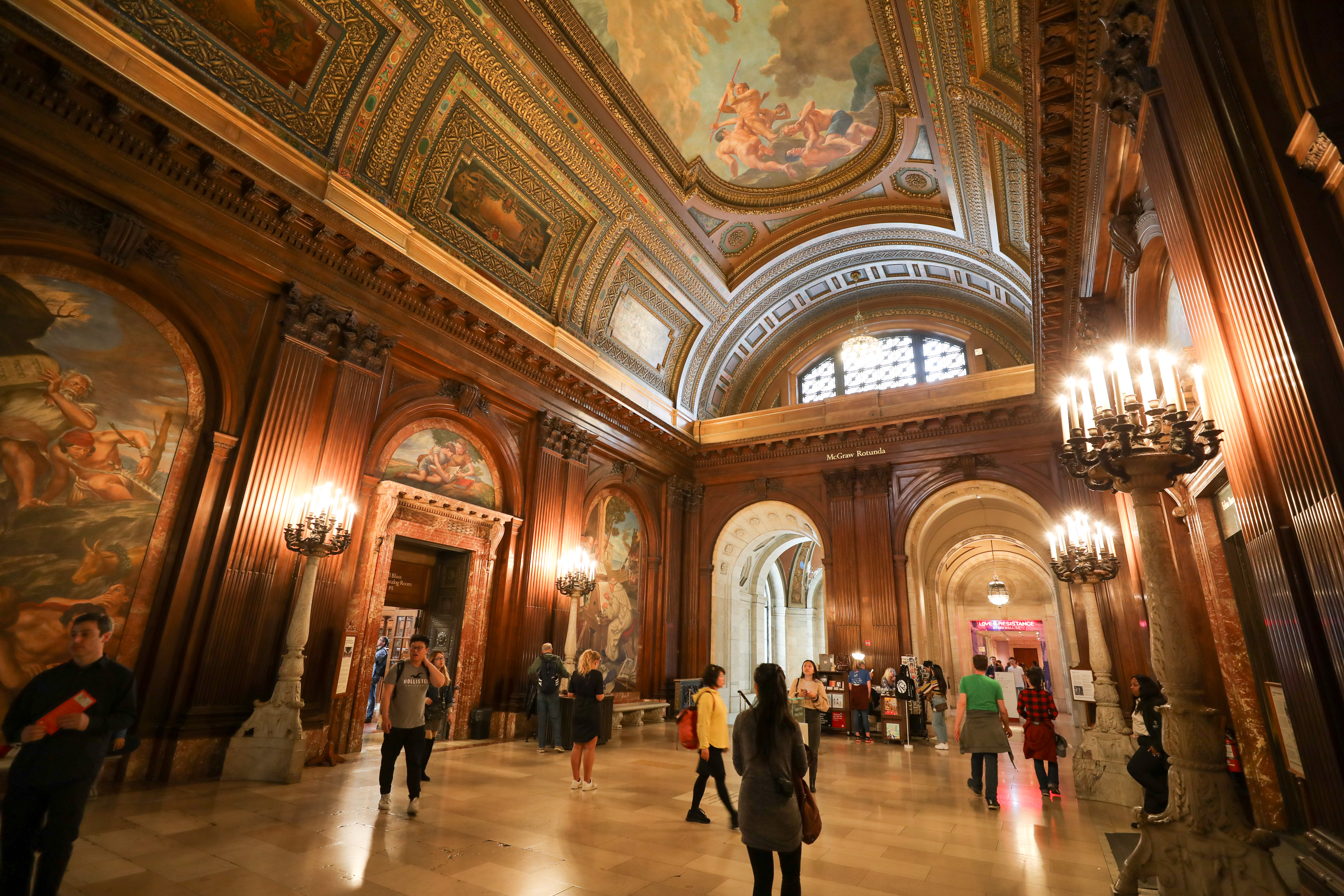
The entrance to the Bill Blass Public Catalog Room (bottom left) through the McGraw Rotunda

The Bill Blass Public Catalog Room, also located in Room 315, connects the McGraw Rotunda and the Main Reading Room; its central location makes it a de facto foyer for the reading room. The room measures 81 by 77 feet (25 by 23 m). Similar to the Main Reading Room, it has a 52-foot-high ceiling. Four chandeliers, of identical design to those in the Main Reading Room, hang from the ceiling. The ceiling of the Public Catalog Room also contains a 27-by-33-foot (8.2 by 10.1 m) section of James Wall Finn's 1911 mural. The building's light courts abut the room's northern and southern walls.

The first renovation of the Catalog Room may have taken place in 1935, when its ceiling was repainted. Further modifications occurred in 1952 when metal cabinets replaced the original oak cabinets as a result of the catalog room's quick expansion, with 150,000 new catalog cards being added each year. The Catalog Room was restored in 1983 and renamed for Bill Blass in 1994. Computers were added following the 1980s expansion.

There is an information desk on the north side on the room, to the right when entering from the rotunda. Originally, visitors would receive card slips with numbers on them and then be directed to one of the Main Reading Room's halves based on their card number. The Public Catalog Room also contains waist-high oak desks on the south side. These desks contain computers that allow New York Public Library cardholders to search the library's catalog.

==== Salomon Room ====
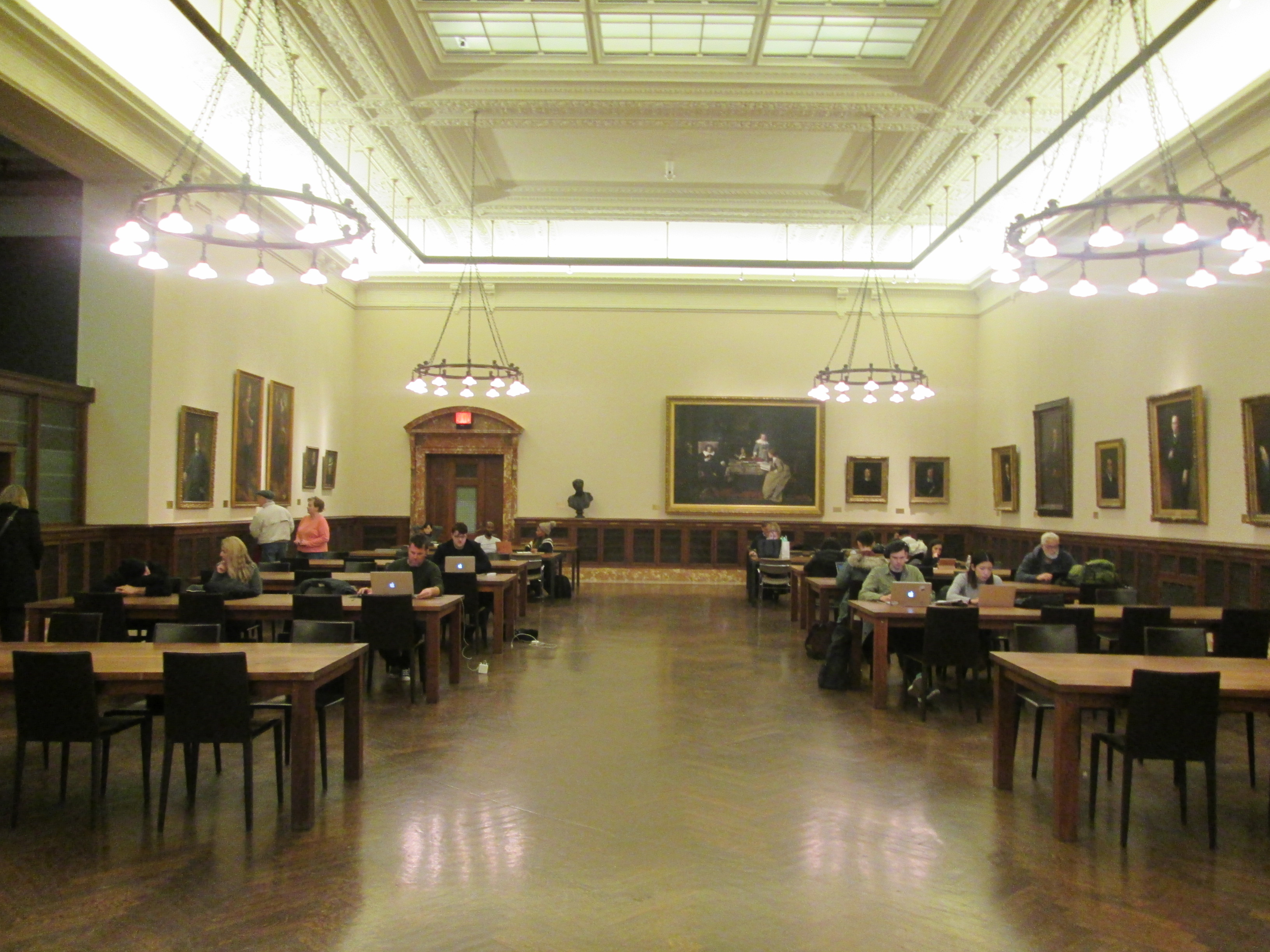
The Salomon Room

The Edna Barnes Salomon Room, located east of the McGraw Rotunda in Room 316, is usually utilized as an event space. It has wooden tables, glass exhibit cases, and a coved ceiling with a skylight. The 4,500-square-foot (420 m^{2}) space was originally intended as a picture gallery, and oil paintings still hang on the walls. In 2009, it was converted to a "wireless Internet reading and study room" to provide overflow capacity for internet users who cannot fit in the Main Reading Room.

=== Non-public stacks ===
The stacks within the Schwarzman Building are a main feature of the building. Housed beneath the Rose Main Reading Room are a series of stacks, which hold an estimated 2.5 million books. At the time of the branch's opening, the stacks could hold 2.7 million books on 63.3 miles (101.9 km) of shelves. There were another 500,000 or 800,000 books stored in various reading rooms. The central stacks, as they are called, have a capacity of 3.5 million books across 88 miles of bookshelves, spanning seven stories. The stacks contain marble floors, as well as iron shelves that are set back from the windows facing Bryant Park. As of 2015, the Main Branch hosts 300,000 books in various reading rooms, though there are none in the central stacks themselves, due to the deteriorated condition of the stacks. There were proposals to demolish the central stacks to make room for the Mid-Manhattan Branch as part of the unrealized Central Library Plan in the early 2010s. As of 2019, the library's trustees had still not determined how to use the abandoned stacks in the main building.

Another 84 miles of stacks under Bryant Park was added in an expansion between 1987 and 1991. The Bryant Park stacks comprise two levels of climate-controlled storage areas. The stacks under Bryant Park contain 1.2 million books on what is called "Level 1", which was completed in the 1991 expansion. A second level of stacks below it, "Level 2", had not been finished when the 1991 expansion was opened. Another 2.5 million books were being moved from the NYPL's ReCAP warehouse in New Jersey to Level 2 as of 2015, and when that was finished, the number of books in the Main Branch's stacks would rise to four million. The Level 2 stacks are called the "Milstein Stacks", after a major donor, and opened in January 2017. As of 2017, the stacks also contain about 400,000 circulating volumes that are usually housed in the Mid-Manhattan Branch, which was closed for renovations until 2020.

Books are delivered from the Bryant Park stacks to the reading rooms on the first through third floors using the "book train". The $2.6 million book delivery system was installed in 2016. It contains a conveyor belt and 24 small red carts emblazoned with the library's lion logo, which each carry up to 30 pounds (14 kg) of books between the stacks and the reading rooms. Each cart moves 75 feet (23 m) per minute and use gears to climb steep or vertical grades. Prior to the installation of the "book train", a Ferris wheel-style conveyor system was installed in the 1990s; it took ten minutes to retrieve a book using the old system. The "Ferris wheel" system, which was complemented by a dumbwaiter, itself replaced a 1920s-era book-delivery system and a 1960s-era dumbwaiter. The new book-delivery system was described as being twice as fast as the old system.

== Library Way ==
Leading up to the Main Branch, on 41st Street between Park and Fifth Avenues, is a series of plaques known as Library Way. Library Way comprises a series of illustrated bronze sidewalk plaques featuring quotes from famous authors, poets, and other notables. It features 96 plaques on the north and south sides of 41st Street. According to The Wall Street Journal, a panel composed of "the Grand Central Partnership, which manages the Grand Central Business Improvement District; and the New Yorker magazine" chose the quotes in the 1990s, while Gregg LeFevre designed the plaques. Each plaque measures 2.5 feet (0.76 m) wide and 1.5 feet (0.46 m) long; originally, there were 98 such plaques. The first three, by Francis Bacon, Emily Dickinson, and Virginia Woolf, were installed in front of 18 East 41st Street in 2002.

Brochures are available at the Friends of the Library counter in the Main Branch's Astor Hall, on the first floor. Granite plaques of similar style can also be seen on the sidewalks of Broadway in Manhattan's Financial District, placed in honor of ticker tape parades held there in the past, as well as on Broadway in the Garment District, where plaques commemorate fashion designers.

== Landmark designations ==
The Main Branch was declared a National Historic Landmark in 1965 and listed on the National Register of Historic Places in 1966. The New York City Landmarks Preservation Commission designated the exterior as a landmark in 1967. The Landmarks Preservation Commission subsequently designated Astor Hall, the first-to-third-floor stairs, and McGraw Rotunda as landmarks in 1974. The Rose Main Reading Room and Public Catalog Room were separately made New York City designated landmarks in 2017, after a four-year effort.

== In popular culture ==
=== Film ===
The Main Branch appears or is depicted in multiple films, including:

- 42nd Street (1933)
- The Clock (1945)
- On the Town (1949)
- Pickup on South Street (1953)
- Breakfast at Tiffany's (1961)
- Two for the Seesaw (1962)
- You're a Big Boy Now (1966)
- The Possession of Joel Delaney (1972)
- Network (1976)
- The Wiz (1978)
- Ghostbusters (1984) and its sequels
- Prizzi's Honor (1984)
- Regarding Henry (1991)
- Quiz Show (1994)
- Picture Perfect (1997)
- The Thomas Crown Affair (1999)
- Finding Forrester (2000)
- Head over Heels (2001)
- Maid in Manhattan (2002)
- Spider-Man (2002)
- The Time Machine (2002)
- 13 Going on 30 (2004)
- The Day After Tomorrow (2004)
- Shortcut to Happiness (2004)
- Spider-Man 3 (2007)
- Sex and the City (2008)
- Uncertainty (2008)
- Arthur (2011)
- The Adjustment Bureau (2011)
- We'll Take Manhattan (2012)
- Winter's Tale (2014)
- Ex Libris: The New York Public Library (2017)

=== Television ===
Television episodes that depicted the Main Branch included "The Library", an episode of Seinfeld, as well as "The Persistence of Memory", the eleventh part of Carl Sagan's TV series Cosmos.

=== Literature ===
The Main Branch also appears in literature, including:

- Lawrence Blochman's Death Walks in Marble Halls (1942)
- Jane Smiley's Duplicate Keys (1984)
- Akimi Yoshida's Banana Fish (1985)
- Allen Kurzweil's The Grand Complication (2001)
- Cynthia Ozick's Heir to the Glimmering World (2004)
- Lynne Sharon Schwartz's Writing on the Wall (2005)
- Peng Shepherd's The Cartographers (2022)

Poems include:

- E. B. White's "A Library Lion Speaks" and "Reading Room" in Poems and Sketches of E.B. White (1981)
- Richard Eberhart's "Reading Room, The New York Public Library", in Collected Poems, 1930–1986 (1988)
- Lawrence Ferlinghetti's "Library Scene, Manhattan", in How to Paint Sunlight (2001)

Excerpts from several of the many memoirs and essays mentioning the Main Branch are included in the anthology Reading Rooms (1991), including reminiscences by Alfred Kazin, Henry Miller, and Kate Simon.

== See also ==
- List of National Historic Landmarks in New York City
- List of New York City Designated Landmarks in Manhattan from 14th to 59th Streets
- List of New York Public Library Branches
- National Register of Historic Places listings in Manhattan from 14th to 59th Streets
- New York Public Library in popular culture
