= Toilets in New York City =

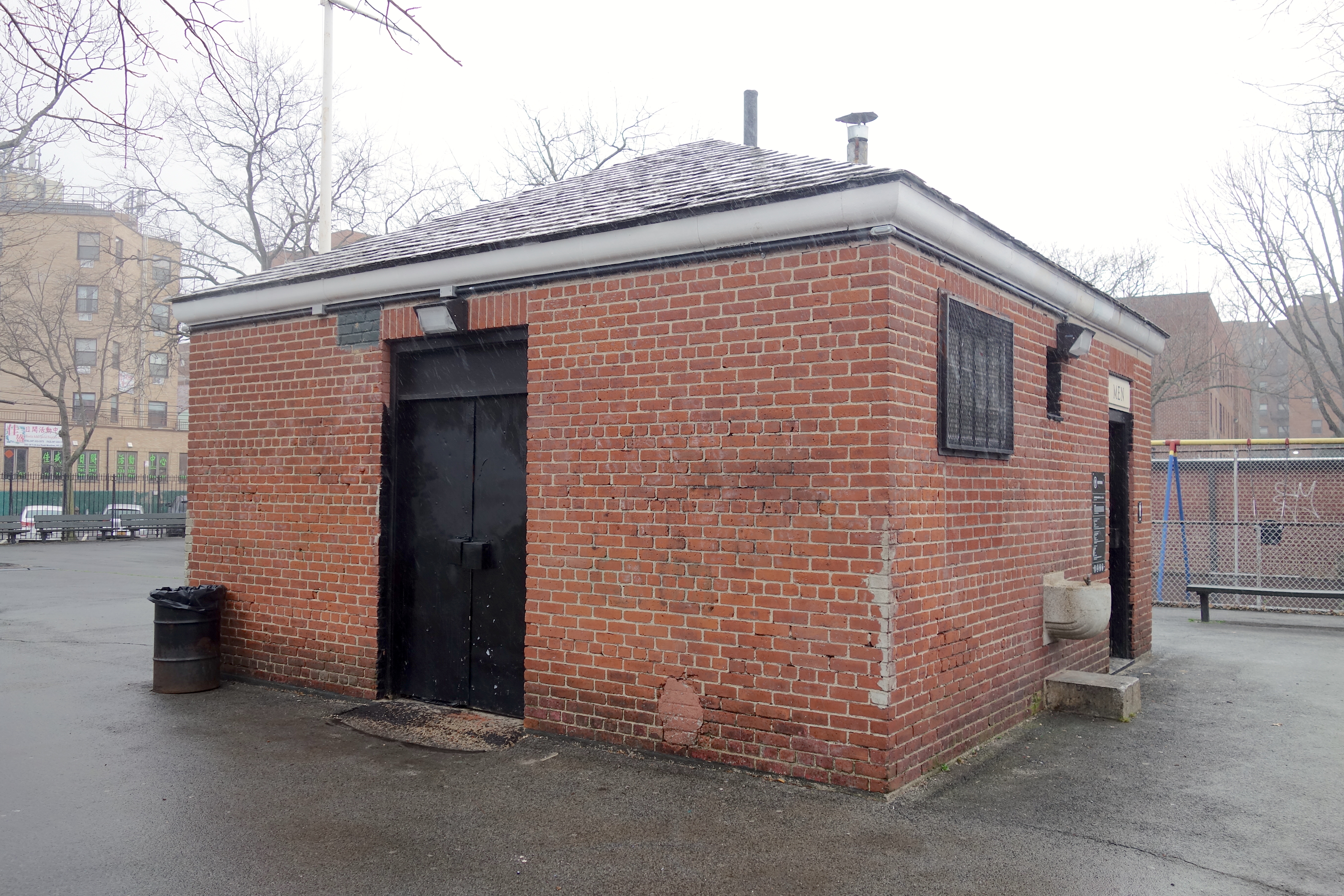
A public toilet in a New York City park

New York City contains approximately 1,100 publicly managed toilets, as well as an unknown number of privately owned toilets. As of 2017, there were around 3.5 million housing units in New York City (many with toilets), while private toilets also exist in offices and other non-residential establishments.

Compared to other big cities, public bathrooms in New York City are rare, as the 1,100 public restrooms result in a rate of 16 per 100,000 residents. Most public restrooms are located in parks; comparatively few other public spaces, including New York City Subway stations, have public restrooms. There have been several attempts to install pay toilets in New York City since the 1990s, and five pay toilets have been installed as part of a program launched in 2006. The cost to build public toilets varies widely, but they averaged $3.6 million as of 2019.

During the mid-19th century, prior to the advent of indoor plumbing and flush toilets, buildings and homes used outhouses and chamber pots as toilets. Proper plumbing was only mandated under the New York State Tenement House Act of 1901.

== Types ==
Flush toilets in New York City private residences are commonplace, though urinals are also common throughout New York City bathrooms, typically in the modern design. There are a number of bars in New York City, including McSorley's Old Ale House, that feature large vintage urinals. The oldest urinal in the city is allegedly located at the Old Town Bar in the Flatiron District.

== History ==
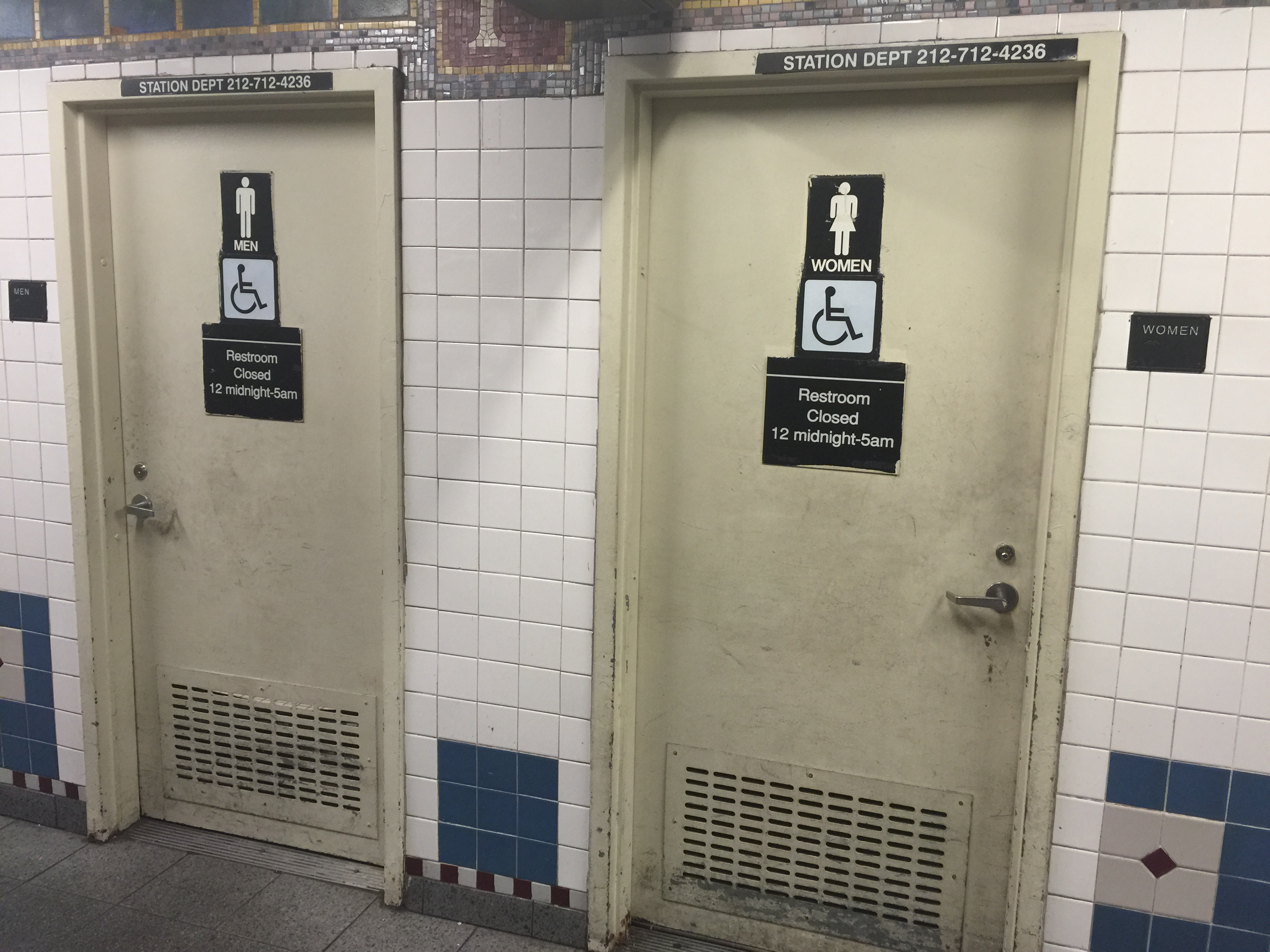
Public toilets in a subway station

As flush toilets were rarely used in Europe before the 19th century, New Amsterdam's first settlers instead brought with them the outhouse custom. During the mid-19th century, prior to the advent of indoor plumbing and flush toilets, buildings and homes were equipped with outhouses and chamber pots. In addition, both poor and rich residents used privy vaults. In the late 19th century, many tenements in New York City, particularly on the Lower East Side, lacked toilets or running water.

Proper plumbing was only mandated by the New York State Tenement House Act of 1901. At that point, New York City's tenements had more than 9,000 privy vaults, euphemistically referred to as "school sinks", in their courtyards. The school sinks were only flushed into the city's primitive sewerage system occasionally and were major vectors for diseases. The 1901 law banned these school sinks and required landlords to replace them with toilets. Afterward, many landlords began installing toilets and bathtubs for their tenants. By 1914, there were only 375 remaining school sinks.

The average New York City resident did not have indoor toilets until the late 19th century. Advancements in plumbing technology allowed for the affordability and installation of toilets in middle-class homes.

As part of the 1968 Building Code of the City of New York, buildings were required to have at least one bathroom per sex per 100 people. This was changed to one bathroom per sex per 150 people in the 2008 Building Code.

In 2012, Mayor Michael Bloomberg signed legislation that permitted small restaurants with a capacity of up to 30 people to provide one restroom, rather than the two restrooms required in most establishments. The administration of Mayor Eric Adams modified the city's building code in 2022 so that restaurants were no longer obligated to open their restrooms to the general public.

== Public access ==
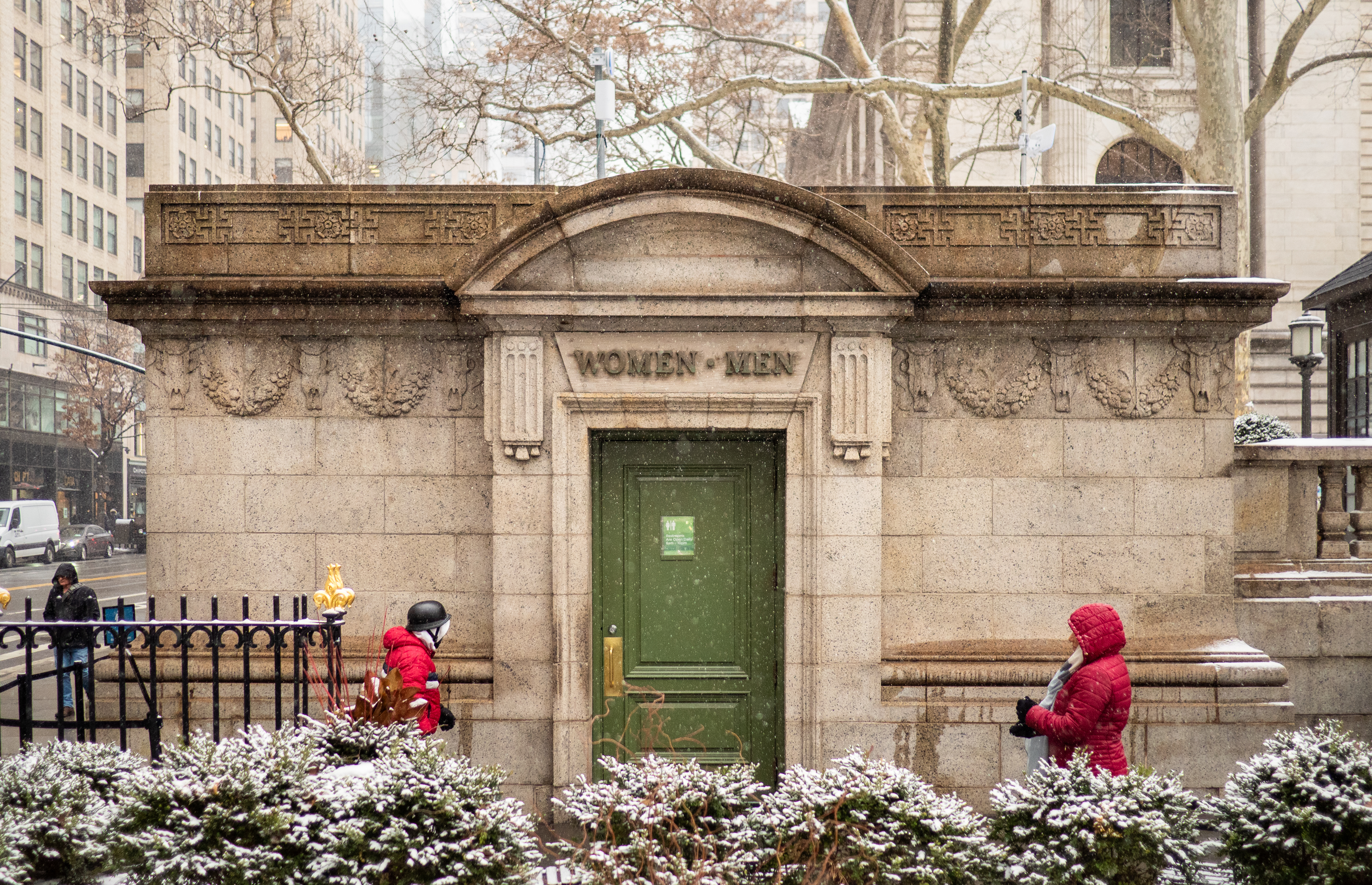
The Bryant Park restroom

Finding a public bathroom in New York City is notoriously difficult. A report issued by the New York City Comptroller's Office in 2019 noted that, of the 100 largest cities in the United States, New York ranked 93rd in the number of comfort stations per 100,000 residents. This equated to only 16 public restrooms per 100,000 residents, compared to 210 in Saint Paul, Minnesota, and 140 in Jacksonville, Florida. The dearth of public toilets has prompted residents to create maps of public restrooms in New York City. Clyde Haberman wrote for The New York Times in 2000: "The fact remains that this is one of the few great world cities that make no attempt to help people cope with so basic a need, a situation that constantly amazes residents and visitors alike." According to Aaron Elstein of Crain's New York, the shortage of public restrooms dates to the 1975 New York City fiscal crisis, when the city government attempted to save money by shutting them down. Homeless New Yorkers reported that the COVID-19 pandemic made it even more difficult to find bathrooms.

As of 2022, the New York City Subway has 472 stations, 69 of which have public bathrooms. Several homeless people sued the New York City government and the Metropolitan Transportation Authority (MTA) in 1990, claiming that the city and MTA created a "public nuisance" by failing to provide public toilets. A report by the Legal Action Center for the Homeless, who represented the plaintiffs, noted that of 526 public comfort stations surveyed in parks, almost three-quarters were "either closed, filthy, foul-smelling or without toilet paper and soap." In 2010, there were 133 open restrooms in 81 of the system's 468 stations.

According to Bloomberg News, there are about 1,103 public bathrooms in New York City, while The New York Times cites the city as having 1,160 public restrooms. Most are in parks, with municipal facilities such as libraries and swimming pools also being common locations. The public bathrooms in Bryant Park, located between 40th and 42nd streets in Manhattan, are noted for their particular beauty and architectural significance. There have also been temporary public bathrooms. For example, toilet paper brand Charmin sponsored a set of public restrooms at 1540 Broadway in Times Square during 2006 and 2007; these toilets were used more than 500,000 times in 2006 alone.

=== Construction costs ===
The cost to build public toilets varies widely. A bathroom in Ferry Point Park in the Bronx cost $4.7 million in 2018 and, at the time, was the most expensive public restroom ever built in New York City. Another bathroom on Aqueduct Walk, also in the Bronx, cost approximately $1 million. On average, in 2019, a public toilet cost $3.6 million to construct. By contrast, in 2011, the Parks Department was spending an average of $1.3 million per project. According to a 2022 report by local television station NY1, existing restrooms cost between $1.4 million and $2.2 million to renovate, while new restrooms cost $3.5 million on average. As of March 2024, a restroom under construction in Seaside Wildlife Nature Park in Staten Island is estimated to cost $6.8 million at completion.

The construction costs of public toilets in New York City have sometimes been the subject of controversy. When a $2.3 million public toilet opened at Elmhurst Park in Queens in 2012, community leader Robert Holden stated: "It's just a tremendous waste of space and, especially, money." Another bathroom at Gravesend Park in Brooklyn, which was completed in 2017 for $2 million, also elicited complaints. Following a controversy over the cost of the Ferry Point Park bathroom, in 2019, the New York City government proposed constructing movable trailers with portable toilets to save money.

=== Pay toilet programs ===
==== Earlier attempts ====
Under the administration of mayor David Dinkins, French company JCDecaux placed several pay toilets across New York City in 1992. As part of the program, JCDecaux was to operate one toilet for handicapped users and four toilets for able-bodied users for four months. If the pilot program was successful, 95 more toilets would be installed across the city. After a successful pilot of the toilets, in early 1993, the New York City Council mandated that JCDecaux provide a single design for handicapped and able-bodied users. JCDecaux objected to the condition, saying that it wished to construct special toilets for handicapped users that required magnetic cards for access. The City Council withdrew its demand for a single restroom design. JCDecaux quit the project anyway in October 1993 because of disputes over the number of ads that would be placed on the restrooms.

In 1994, the New York City Department of Parks and Recreation and the New York City Department of Transportation separately began testing wheelchair-accessible toilets. The New York City Council had planned to award a contract for the toilets the same year, but this contract was delayed because of disputes over the sizes of advertisements on the proposed restrooms. By late 1994, the city had only one automated pay toilet in front of New York City Hall; this toilet was removed in 1997. The New York City government again planned to award a contract for 30 pay toilets in 1996, as part of a larger plan that also included redesigning the city's newsstands and bus stops. If the program had been implemented, the toilets would have been installed starting in 1998. However, mayor Rudy Giuliani halted the program in 1998 following major controversies. Among the complaints was the cost of each toilet, the number of accessible toilets, the presence of advertising on the restrooms, and opposition to the toilets in many neighborhoods.

In January 2001, the city opened automated self-cleaning pay toilets at Herald and Greeley Squares. The toilets worked about 90 percent of the time. The toilets were managed by a local business improvement district, 34th Street Partnership. According to the partnership, the toilets were unsatisfactory for a variety of reasons including the 2-minute clean time between users, cost of maintenance, and declining of popularity. By 2008, the automated self-cleaning pay toilets at Herald and Greeley Squares were shut down and replaced with manually cleaned ones.

==== Cemusa agreement ====
When Michael Bloomberg became mayor of New York City in 2002, he announced plans to install pay toilets in the city. Many newsstand owners opposed the project as it allowed the private company managing the toilets to manage their newsstands as well. In 2005, as part of a $1 billion, 20-year agreement with Spanish company Cemusa, the firm planned to place 20 public toilets around New York City. Prototypes of the toilets were announced in early 2006; these toilets cost 25 cents to use for 15 minutes. The first toilet was installed in Madison Square Park in March 2008 and was extremely popular. Despite the city's plan to install five toilets by the end of 2008, only one other toilet had been installed by mid-2009, in Corona, Queens. By the mid-2010s, only three toilets had been installed. Two additional toilets were installed by 2018, over halfway through the agreement with Cemusa (which had since merged with JCDecaux), while the other fifteen toilets were in storage. The program faced several obstacles, including community opposition in several neighborhoods, as well as the city's refusal to install pay toilets in flood-prone neighborhoods. The 5 public toilets accommodated between 15 and 50 visitors a day on average.

As of December 2022 the New York City 311 website described the toilets as "climate-controlled" and noted their inclusion of "a toilet, a wash basin with running warm water, and a mirror". They are open from 8 am to 8 pm, cost $0.25 to use, and are ADA compliant. The site also accepts complaints about existing facilities and requests for new ones.

=== Expansion of free toilets ===
All subway restrooms were closed in 2020 due to the COVID-19 pandemic and remained shuttered for over two years. The MTA reopened eighteen restrooms at nine subway stations in January 2023, with plans to reopen restrooms at an additional twelve stations that May. As of 2024, there were 58 open bathrooms throughout the subway system.

The city's lack of public restrooms was especially noticeable during the COVID-19 pandemic, when many restrooms were closed. In early 2022, city councilmember Rita Joseph introduced a bill that would mandate the construction of public restrooms in every neighborhood in New York City. That October, the New York City Council passed local law 2022/114. The bill directs a report to be prepared which identifies the currently available public bathrooms, and feasible locations for new ones in most Zip Code Tabulation Areas in the city. In 2023, the City Council introduced legislation that would require one public toilet per 2,000 residents, thereby increasing the number of public toilets in the city to 4,000 by 2035. The city government announced in June 2024 that, as part of the "Ur In Luck" program, it would construct 46 restrooms and renovate another 36 restrooms citywide.

Solar-powered toilet installed at Cadman Plaza in Brooklyn

The administration of Mayor Zohran Mamdani announced a $4 million pilot program in January 2026, which would install 20 to 30 modular public restrooms citywide. In June 2026, Mamdani announced that the city had ordered 17 solar-powered public bathrooms from Throne Labs; these began to be installed in September.

== See also ==
- America (Cattelan) – functioning gold toilet sculpture created in 2016 for the Solomon R. Guggenheim Museum by Italian artist Maurizio Cattelan
- New York City water supply system
