= Kathryn Harvey =

Kathryn Harvey may refer to:

- Kathryn Harvey (soccer) (born 1997), Canadian soccer player
- Barbara Wood, an author who used the pen name Kathryn Harvey
