= Somebody Somewhere (TV series) =

American comedy drama television series

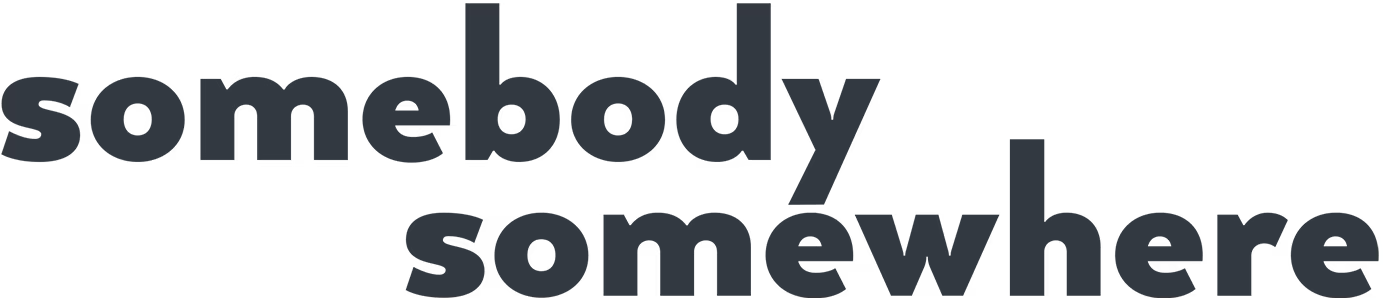
- Genre: Comedy drama
- Created by: Hannah Bos; Paul Thureen
- Starring: Bridget Everett; Jeff Hiller; Mary Catherine Garrison; Danny McCarthy; Mike Hagerty; Murray Hill; Jane Drake Brody; Jon Hudson Odom; Heidi Johanningmeier
- Composers: Amanda Delores; Patricia Jones
- Country of origin: United States
- Original language: English
- No. of seasons: 3
- No. of episodes: 21

Production
- Executive producers: Bridget Everett; Carolyn Strauss; Mark Duplass; Jay Duplass; Mel Eslyn; Hannah Bos; Paul Thureen; Patricia Breen; Tyler Romary
- Producer: Shuli Harel
- Production location: Chicago metropolitan area
- Camera setup: Single-camera
- Running time: 24–30 minutes
- Production companies: Duplass Brothers Productions; The Mighty Mint

Original release
- Network: HBO
- Release: January 16, 2022 – December 8, 2024

Somebody Somewhere is an American comedy drama television series starring Bridget Everett and created by Hannah Bos and Paul Thureen. Set in Manhattan, Kansas, the series follows Sam (Everett) as she returns to her hometown and navigates life after the death of her sister.

The series premiered on HBO on January 16, 2022, and was renewed for a second season in February 2022 that premiered on April 23, 2023. The series was renewed for a third season in June 2023. In August 2024, it was confirmed the series would end after the third season, which premiered on October 27, 2024.

== Cast and characters ==
=== Main ===
- Bridget Everett as Sam Miller, a woman in her 40s who moves back to her hometown to care for her dying sister (the show starts after the sister’s death), and adjusts to changes in her life and relationships with family and friends.
- Jeff Hiller as Joel, Sam's co-worker and friend
- Mary Catherine Garrison as Tricia Miller, Sam's sister who runs a store called Tender Moments
- Danny McCarthy as Rick (season 1), Tricia's husband
- Mike Hagerty as Ed Miller (season 1), Sam's father and a farmer
- Murray Hill as Fred Rococo, a soil scientist and a master of ceremonies
- Jane Drake Brody as Mary Jo "MJ" Miller (seasons 1–2), Sam's mother struggling with alcoholism
- Jon Hudson Odom as Michael (season 1), Joel's boyfriend
- Heidi Johanningmeier as Charity Cooper (season 1), (Note: Johanningmeier is credited with the main cast in select episodes of season 2 for use of her likeness.) co-owner of Tender Moments

=== Recurring ===
- Mercedes White as Tiffani, a veterinarian and member of Sam and Joel's friend group
- Kailey Albus as Shannon (seasons 1–2), Tricia's teenage daughter
- Josh Bywater as Coop (season 1), Charity's husband
- Tim Bagley as Brad Schraeder (seasons 2–3), Joel's new love interest
- Jennifer Mudge as Susan (seasons 2–3), Fred's fiancée
- Barbara Robertson as Darlene (season 2), Sam's vocal coach
- Ólafur Darri Ólafsson as Víglundur 'Iceland' Hjartarson (season 3), a man who is renting Sam's family farm home

== Production ==
In July 2020, HBO ordered Somebody Somewhere to series. The show is inspired by the life of Bridget Everett, who plays the lead role and is also an executive producer. In June 2021, the cast was announced, including Jeff Hiller, Mary Catherine Garrison, Danny McCarthy, Mike Hagerty (in his final acting role before his death in May 2022), Murray Hill, Jon Hudson Odom, and Heidi Johanningmeier. In February 2022, HBO renewed the series for a second season.

The series was filmed in suburban Chicago, primarily in Lockport and Warrenville. The creators chose Chicago as a filming location because of the talent pool available; Hannah Bos said, "We cast a lot of roles out of Chicago, and the talent pool was insane. It was exciting to have so many choices for so many roles. I'm biased because I love the Chicago style of acting — which I feel is very grounded, very real, very nuanced — and we had many wonderful actors to draw on to fill our world in."

In June 2023, HBO renewed the series for a third season. In August 2024, it was confirmed the series would end after its third season.

== Episodes ==
Season	Episodes	Originally released	
Season	Episodes	First released	Last released
1	7	January 16, 2022	February 27, 2022
2	7	April 23, 2023	May 28, 2023
3	7	October 27, 2024	December 8, 2024

=== Season 1 (2022) ===
No. overall	No. in season	Title	Directed by	Written by	Original release date	U.S. viewers (millions)
1	1	"BFD"	Jay Duplass	Hannah Bos & Paul Thureen	January 16, 2022	0.202
2	2	"Knick-Knacks and Doodads"	Robert Cohen	Hannah Bos & Paul Thureen	January 23, 2022	0.113
3	3	"Egg Shells"	Robert Cohen	Patricia Breen	January 30, 2022	0.093
4	4	"Feast of St. Francis"	Robert Cohen	Patricia Breen	February 6, 2022	0.082
5	5	"Tee-Tee Pa-Pah"	Jay Duplass	Hannah Bos & Paul Thureen	February 13, 2022	0.118
6	6	"Life Could Be a Dream"	Robert Cohen	Patricia Breen	February 20, 2022	0.142
7	7	"Mrs. Diddles"	Jay Duplass	Hannah Bos & Paul Thureen	February 27, 2022	0.159

=== Season 2 (2023) ===
No. overall	No. in season	Title	Directed by	Written by	Original release date	U.S. viewers (millions)
8	1	"NNP"	Robert Cohen	Hannah Bos & Paul Thureen and Bridget Everett	April 23, 2023	0.144
9	2	"#2"	Robert Cohen	Lisa Kron	April 30, 2023	0.181
10	3	"SLS"	Robert Cohen	Rachel Axler	May 7, 2023	N/A
11	4	"Keys Phone Cash ID"	Jay Duplass	Hannah Bos & Paul Thureen and Bridget Everett	May 14, 2023	0.153
12	5	"NMB NMP"	Lennon Parham	Rachel Axler	May 21, 2023	0.119
13	6	"Manhappiness"	Lennon Parham	Lisa Kron	May 28, 2023	0.123
14	7	"To Ed"	Jay Duplass	Hannah Bos & Paul Thureen	May 28, 2023	0.105

=== Season 3 (2024) ===
No. overall	No. in season	Title	Directed by	Written by	Original release date	U.S. viewers (millions)
15	1	"Margarini"	Robert Cohen	Hannah Bos & Paul Thureen and Bridget Everett	October 27, 2024	0.103
16	2	"Dinky Dinkies"	Robert Cohen	Lisa Kron	November 3, 2024	0.090
17	3	"Porch Lyfe"	Robert Cohen	Lennon Parham	November 10, 2024	0.112
18	4	"What if it spreads?"	Jay Duplass	Hannah Bos & Paul Thureen and Bridget Everett	November 17, 2024	0.074
19	5	"Num Nums"	Lennon Parham	Lisa Kron	November 24, 2024	0.074
20	6	"As Much as I Like Not Feeling"	Lennon Parham	Lennon Parham	December 1, 2024	0.099
21	7	"AGG"	Lennon Parham	Hannah Bos & Paul Thureen and Bridget Everett	December 8, 2024	0.091

== Reception ==
=== Critical response ===
On Rotten Tomatoes, the first season holds a 100% approval rating based on 30 reviews, with an average rating of 8.6/10. The site's critical consensus reads, "Led by a captivating Bridget Everett, Somebody Somewhere explores the human condition with tenderness, grace, and warmth." On Metacritic, the first season has a score of 86 out of 100, based on 12 reviews. Richard Roeper of the Chicago Sun-Times gave it a perfect four-star review and wrote that the series "is a superb and instantly engrossing work, with [Bridget] Everett delivering a knockout performance."

On Rotten Tomatoes, the second season holds a 100% approval rating based on 20 reviews, with an average rating of 9/10. The site's critical consensus reads, "Somebody Somewhere captures the bittersweet beauty of life in all its minutiae, never forgetting to laugh in the face of adversity." On Metacritic, the second season has a score of 93 out of 100, based on 6 reviews. Coleman Spilde of The Daily Beast wrote that the second season "confirms the series as one of the decade's finest, thanks to its delightful ensemble cast and a knack for fleshing out life's minutiae, with gravity and irreverence in equal measure."

On Rotten Tomatoes, the third season holds a 100% approval rating based on 21 reviews, with an average rating of 9.3/10. The site's critical consensus reads, "Authentic and revelatory to the very end, Somebody Somewhere's final season fittingly feels like a casual hangout with the dearest of friends." On Metacritic, the third season has a score of 92 out of 100, based on 8 reviews. Aramide Tinubu of Variety gave it a highly positive review, calling it "just as magical as ever" and that the series "is a stunningly honest depiction of friendship, grace and courage."

=== Accolades ===
Year	Ceremony	Category	Recipient(s)	Result	Ref.
2022	Dorian Awards	Best LGBTQ Show	Somebody Somewhere	Nominated	
2022	Dorian Awards	Best Unsung Show	Somebody Somewhere	Nominated	
2022	Dorian Awards	TV Lead Performance	Bridget Everett	Won	
2022	Dorian Awards	Best TV Supporting Performance	Jeff Hiller	Nominated	
2022	Dorian Awards	Best TV Musical Performance	"Don't Give Up"	Nominated	
2022	Gotham Independent Film Awards	Breakthrough Series – Short Form	Somebody Somewhere	Nominated	
2022	Hollywood Critics Association Awards	Best Cable Series, Comedy	Somebody Somewhere	Nominated	
2022	Hollywood Critics Association Awards	Best Actress in a Broadcast Network or Cable Series, Comedy	Bridget Everett	Nominated	
2022	Hollywood Critics Association Awards	Best Directing in a Broadcast Network or Cable Series, Comedy	Jay Duplass (for "Tee-Tee Pa-Pah")	Nominated	
2022	Humanitas Prize	Comedy Teleplay	Hannah Bos & Paul Thureen (for "B.F.D.")	Nominated	
2022	Television Critics Association Awards	Individual Achievement in Comedy	Bridget Everett	Nominated	
2022	Peabody Awards	Entertainment	Somebody Somewhere	Nominated	
2023	American Film Institute Awards	Top 10 Television Programs of 2022	Somebody Somewhere	Won	
2023	Independent Spirit Awards	Best Lead Performance in a New Scripted Series	Bridget Everett	Nominated	
2023	Independent Spirit Awards	Best Supporting Performance in a New Scripted Series	Jeff Hiller	Nominated	
2024	Critics' Choice Awards	Best Actress in a Comedy Series	Bridget Everett	Nominated	
2024	Peabody Awards	Entertainment	Somebody Somewhere	Won	
2025	Critics' Choice Television Awards	Best Actress in a Comedy Series	Bridget Everett	Nominated	
2025	Critics' Choice Television Awards	Best Comedy Series	Somebody Somewhere	Nominated	
2025	Primetime Emmy Awards	Outstanding Supporting Actor in a Comedy Series	Jeff Hiller	Won	
2025	Primetime Emmy Awards	Outstanding Writing for a Comedy Series	Hannah Bos, Paul Thureen and Bridget Everett (for "AGG")	Nominated	
2025	Television Critics Association Awards	Outstanding Achievement in Comedy	Somebody Somewhere	Nominated	
2025	Television Critics Association Awards	Individual Achievement in Comedy	Bridget Everett	Won	
