= Bryant Park restroom =

Public toilet in Manhattan, New York

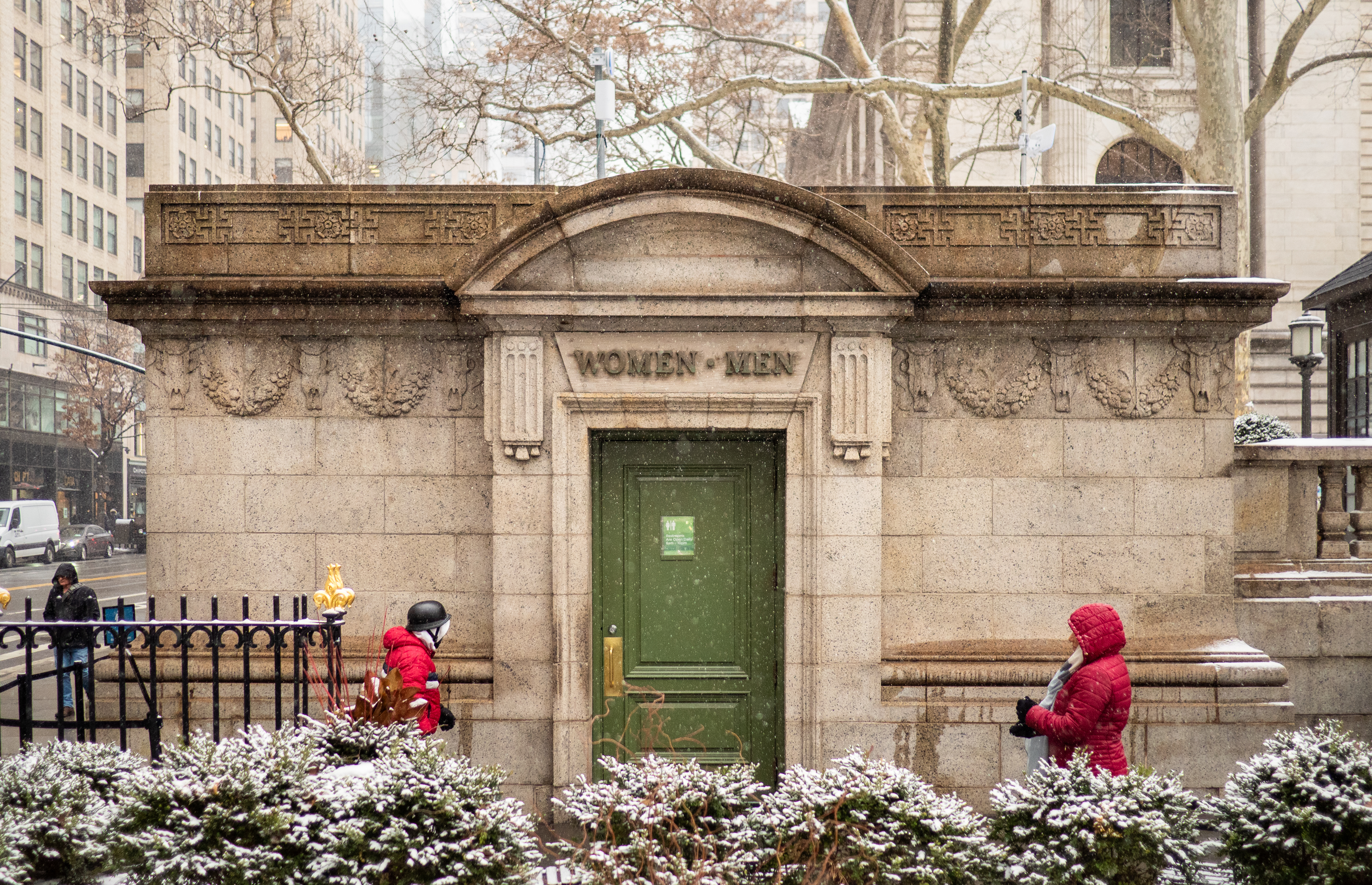
- Bryant Park restroom in 2024
- Interactive map of the Bryant Park restroom area

General information
- Architectural style: Beaux-Arts
- Location: Bryant Park, Manhattan, New York, U.S.
- Coordinates: 40.753889°N 73.9825°W
- Opened: 1911
- Renovated: 1990s, 2006, 2017
- Closed: 1960s-1990s
- Renovation cost: $200,000 (2006) $280,000 (2017)

Technical details
- Size: 315-square-foot (29.3 m^{2})

Design and construction
- Architecture firm: Carrère and Hastings

Renovating team
- Renovating firm: Kupiec & Koutsomitis (1990s)
- Bryant Park restroom
- U.S. Historic district – Contributing property
- Part of: New York Public Library and Bryant Park (ID66000547)
- Designated CP: October 15, 1966

The Bryant Park restroom is a public toilet in Bryant Park, an urban park in the New York City borough of Manhattan. The 315-square-foot (29.3 m^{2}) structure was built at the same time as the New York Public Library Main Branch and designed by the same architects, John Merven Carrere and Thomas Hastings. The building, which sits on the park's border with 42nd Street, is a Beaux-Arts design. It opened in 1911 and closed in the 1960s as the surrounding park deteriorated. After decades of disuse, the facility was restored in the 1990s as part of a broader park revitalization, and underwent further renovations in 2006 and 2017, with interiors modeled after luxury hotel bathrooms.

Featuring fresh flowers, automatic toilets, original artwork, classical music, and an attendant, the facility is often regarded as among the best public bathrooms in the city. It was recognized by Cintas as one of America's Best Restrooms in both 2011 and 2018, and was ranked the best public restroom in the world by travel website VirtualTourist in 2011. About a million people use the toilet every year.

== History ==
Bryant Park is a 9.6-acre (39,000 m^{2}) public park located in the New York City borough of Manhattan. It is bordered by Fifth Avenue, Sixth Avenue, 40th Street, and 42nd Street in the Midtown neighborhood of Manhattan. Originally Reservoir Square, it was renamed in 1884 for abolitionist and journalist William Cullen Bryant. The New York Public Library Main Branch opened in the east end of the park in 1911, alongside several park improvements including public restrooms. The park deteriorated in the mid-20th century, and the restrooms were closed in the 1960s.

In the early 1990s, Bryant Park underwent a revitalization and the restrooms were restored by Kupiec & Koutsomitis, reopening in 1992. Following years of heavy use, they underwent renovations in 2006 costing $200,000. When completed, New York City Parks Commissioner Adrian Benepe called it "the gold standard for park comfort stations" and said it was like "the Oyster Bar – transplanted into a park." The toilets underwent additional renovations in 2017, costing $280,000. While the restrooms were closed for improvements, park management brought in four portable toilets, decorated the space around them, and had an attendant working to clean them after every use. A toilet paper ribbon-cutting ceremony was held for their reopening.

== Structure ==
The restroom building was built at the same time as the New York Public Library Main Branch and was designed by the library's architects, John Merven Carrere and Thomas Hastings. Both opened in 1911. It is a Beaux-Arts granite structure on the park's northern border, along 42nd Street. It is 25 feet long by 18 feet wide and houses separate men's and women's facilities. The exterior of the building contains a frieze with garland motifs. The interior is 315 square feet, with a coffered ceiling, crown moldings, earth-toned tile mosaics and brushed stainless steel sconces.

The building underwent renovations in the early 1990s, 2006, and 2017, but cannot be expanded due to the park's landmark status. The interior designs from the 2006 and 2017 renovations attempted to match the traditional aesthetics of the Beaux-Arts exterior. They were inspired by local luxury hotel bathrooms, like the Plaza Hotel and St. Regis, as well as by socialite Brooke Astor, whose criticisms of the park's condition to David Rockefeller in 1979 may have sparked the needed fundraising.

== Amenities ==
The men's side has two toilet stalls and three urinals and the women's side has three stalls. The rooms are air conditioned and the toilets are self-flushing, with an automatic sanitary seat covering system. Fresh flowers decorate the space and classical music plays through a speaker system. Electric hand driers were chosen on the basis of quietness, to be able to still hear the music. An attendant is present full-time, from 7:00 a.m. until 10:00 p.m. or midnight, depending on the time of year. The restroom rules disallow using it to wash clothes, bathe, shave, or brush teeth.

Since the 2017 renovation, the facility displays rotating artworks selected from a collection of 225 pieces. The works typically depict the park and are created through a painters-in-residence program. Many of the designs and technologies used in the 2017 renovations are intended to be ecologically friendly, such as LED lighting, temperature controls, electricity generated through toilets and sinks, and low energy driers.

The facility costs $271,000 per year to operate as of 2017, including $27,000 for toilet paper and $14,160 for flowers. The bathroom, as with the rest of Bryant Park, is paid for by private revenue sources and corporate sponsorships without the need for municipal funding.

== Reception ==
According to Adrian Benepe in 2006, the Bryant Park bathroom was the most used of all those in the park system, as well as the most well known. The New York Times called it "the grandest of the park system's 600 bathrooms" in 2006 and the "Tiffany's of public restrooms" in 2017, noting that it "is somewhat symbolic of Bryant Park nowadays. After years of being plagued by drugs and crime, the green space has evolved into a gem in the heart of Manhattan". The Associated Press described it as "posh" and a "free-of-charge, air-conditioned splendor" and Theodora Siegel, who operates a viral public restroom review account on TikTok, named it the best in New York. The restrooms have been described as being among the city's best, frequently contrasted with the notoriously dirty state of most of the city's public toilets. In 2010 and 2018, Cintas listed them among the finalists its annual Best Restroom contest. Travel website Virtual Tourist ranked them the best in the world in 2011. There is often a line to get in.

In 2005 it was used by about 613,000 people, serving up to 300 per hour during busy times. Two-thirds of the people who use it do so without using the park. In 2013, the bathroom was used by 1,818 people per day, which increased to 3,266 people per day in 2016 – about 1.2 million visitors in total.

== Gallery ==
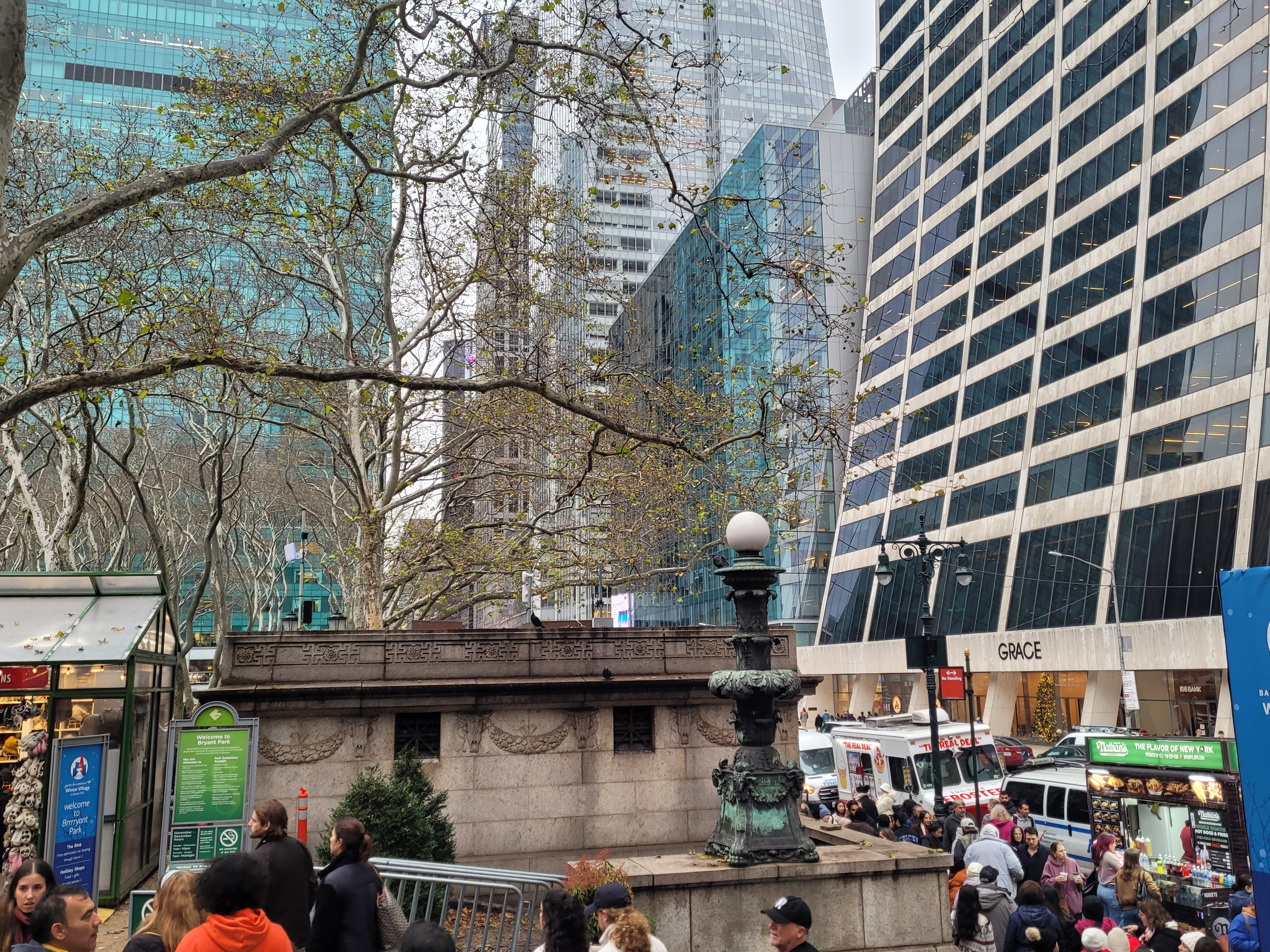
Seen from the back, facing west; the Grace Building is visible behind it

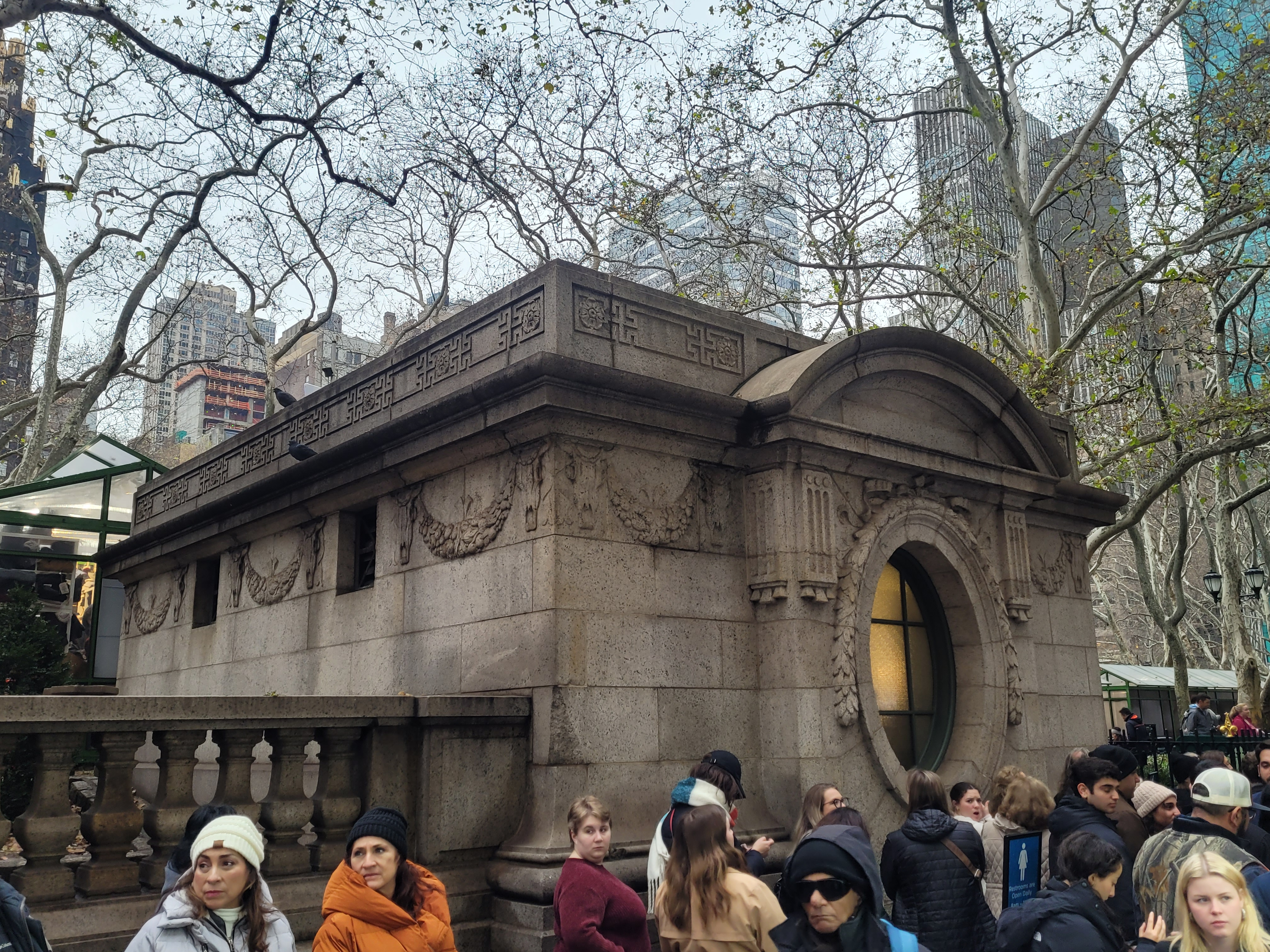
Side of the structure, seen from 42nd Street; a line waits to be allowed entry

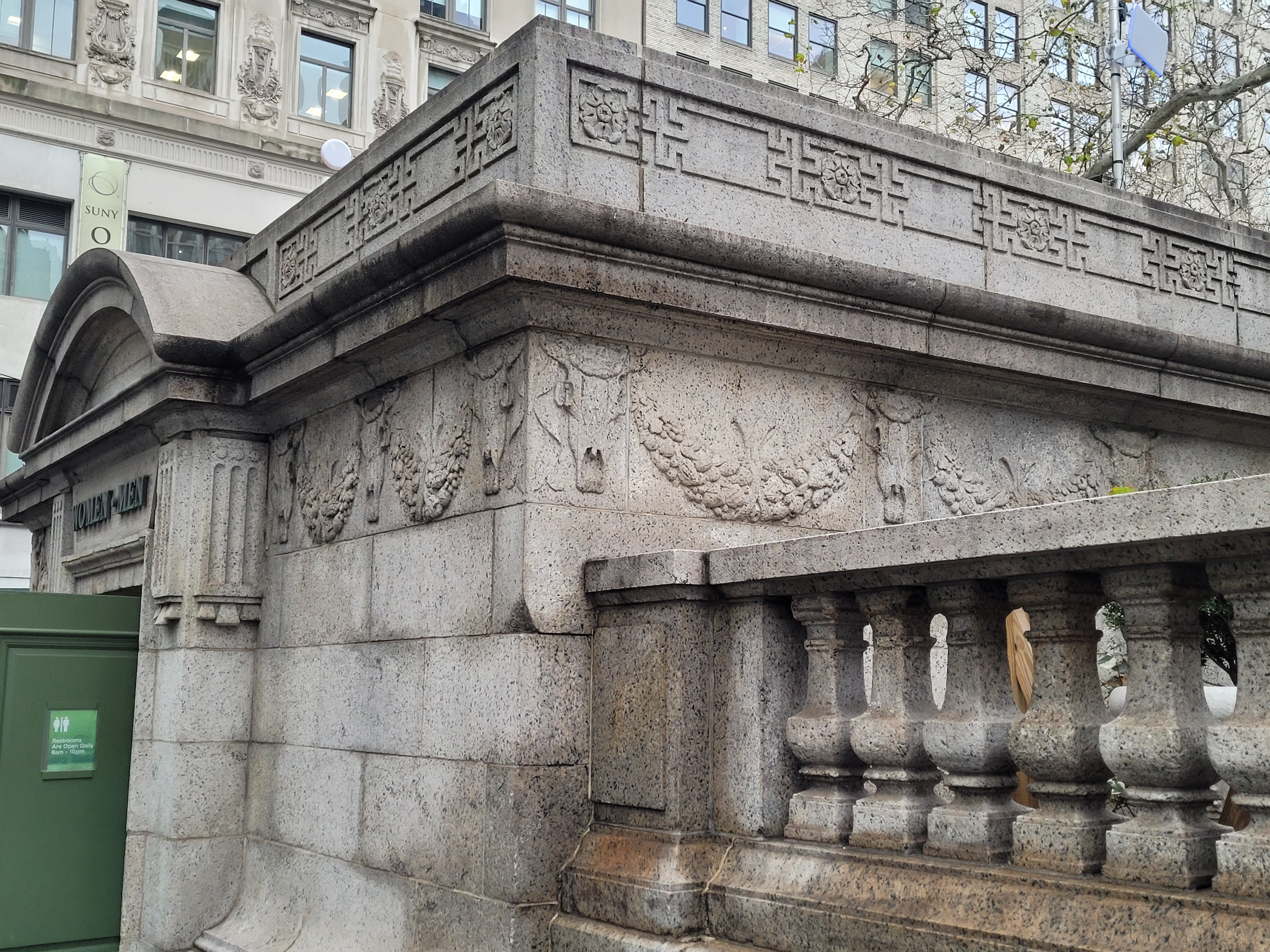
Close-up detail of engravings on the wall

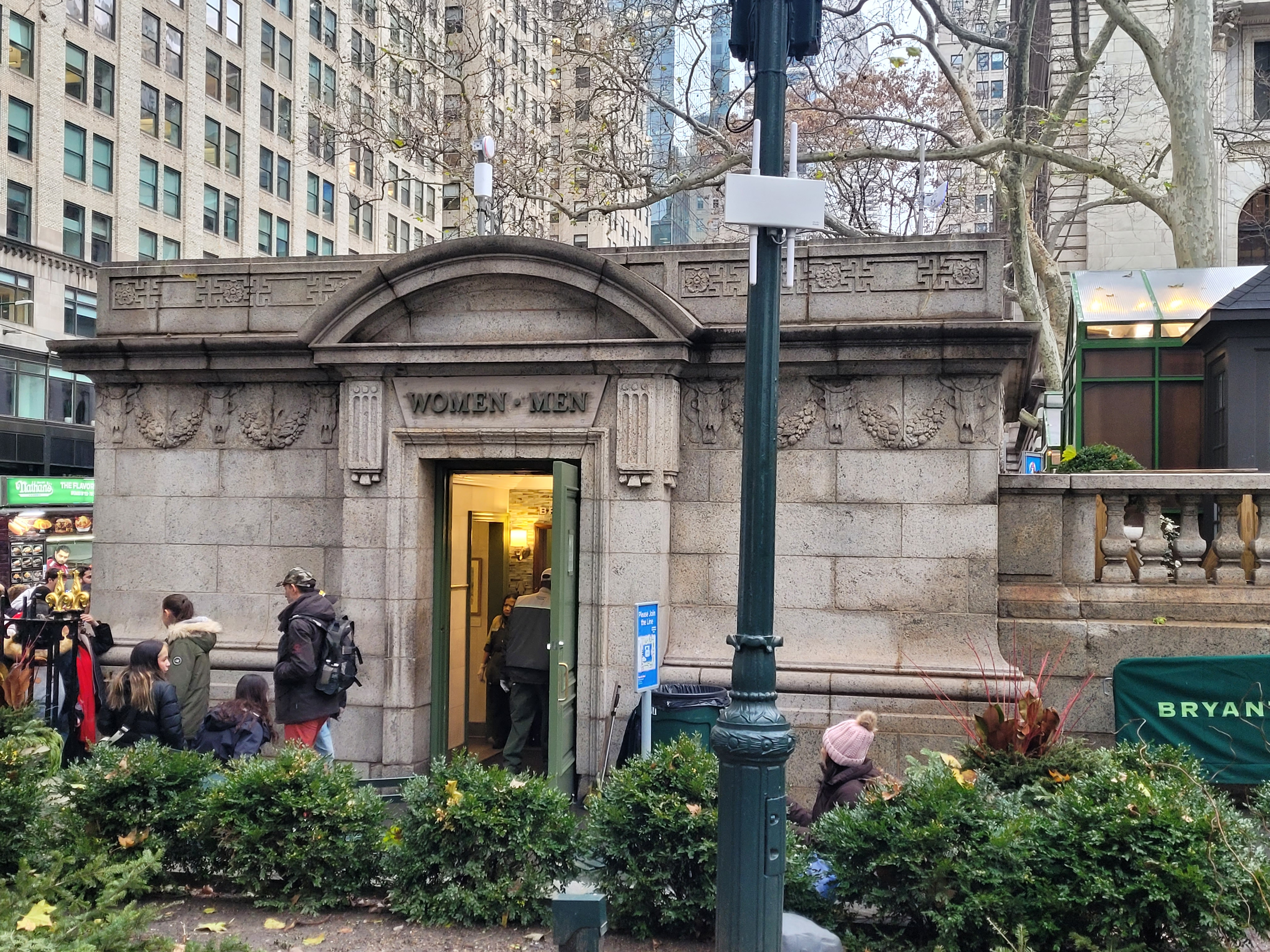
Front of the building with open door

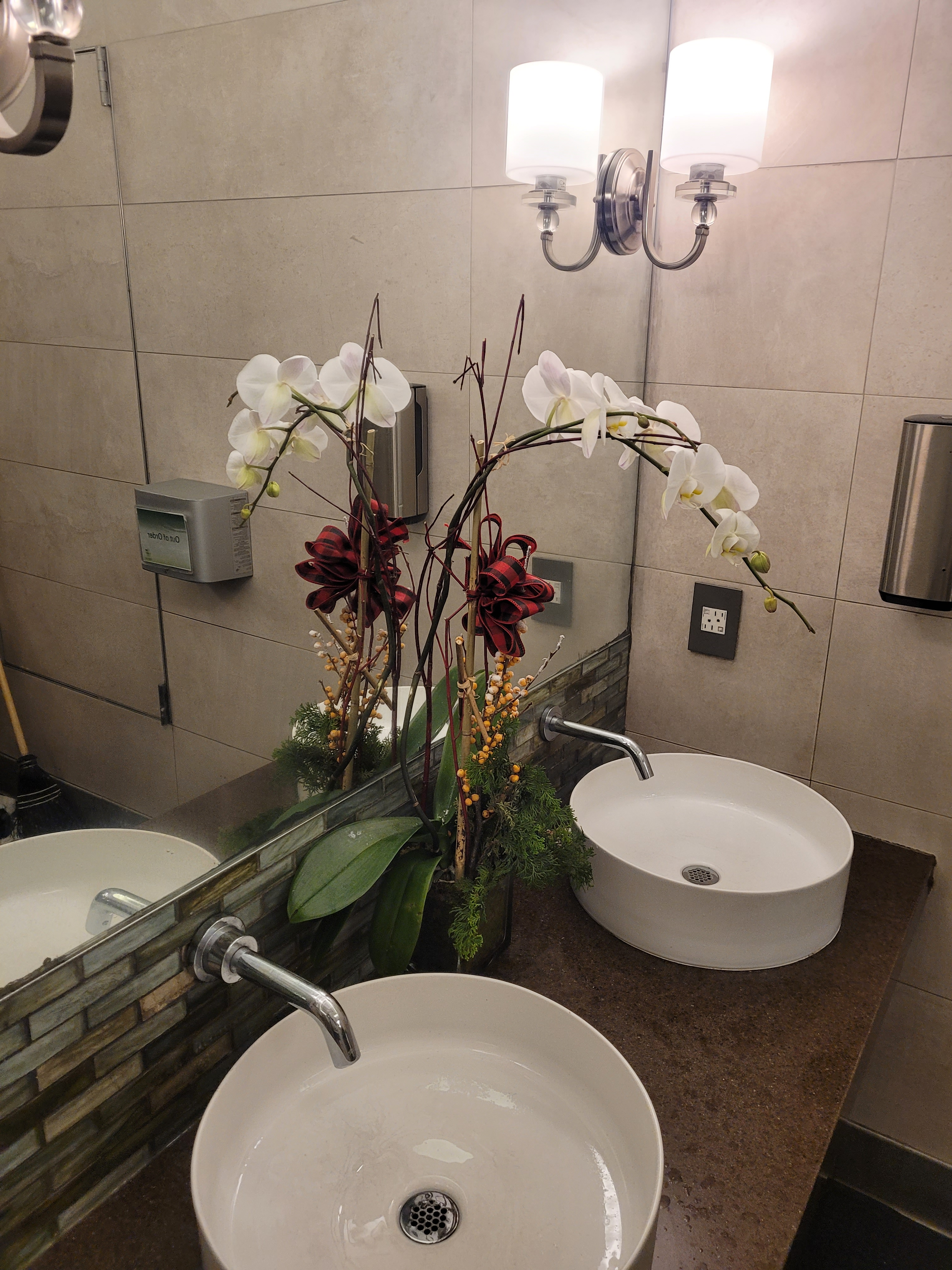
Sinks and flowers in the interior

== See also ==
- Toilets in New York City
