= Hester Biosciences =

Indian Pharmaceutical company pvt ltd

Hester Biosciences Limited
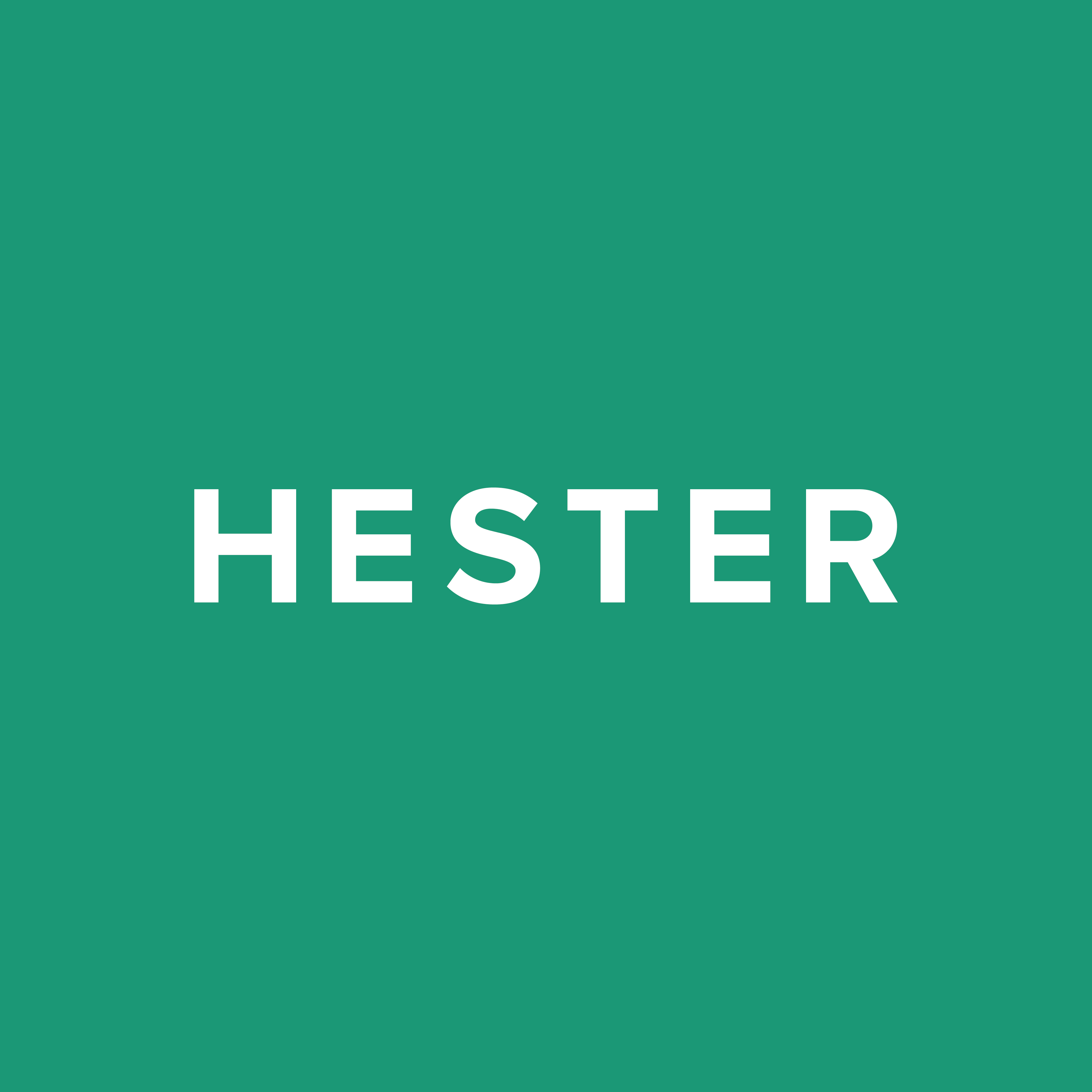
- Type: Public
- Traded as: NSE: HESTERBIO; BSE: 524669
- Industry: Animal healthcare
- Founded: 1983
- Founder: Rajiv Gandhi
- Headquarters: Ahmedabad, India
- Area served: Worldwide
- Products: Poultry & Large Animal Vaccines
- Number of employees: 300
- Website: www.hester.in

Hester Biosciences Limited (HBL) is a publicly traded Indian animal and poultry vaccines manufacturing company, headquartered in Ahmedabad. Hester has plants situated in Gujarat and Nepal. Hester has a 30% share of the poultry vaccines market in India, making it the country's second largest poultry vaccine manufacturer. Hester is also the first commercial manufacturer of goat pox vaccine in India and manufactures PPR vaccines from both, Nigerian and Sungri strains.

== Finances ==
Hester equity shares are listed on the National Stock Exchange of India (NSE) as HESTERBIO and on the BSE (Security Code: 524669). They are also the owners of subsidiaries including Hester Biosciences Africa, and have acquired other company's like Gujarat Agrofarm (which they purchased in 2007). As on 31 March 2019, market capitalisation of the company stood at Rs. 13.1 billion. The CEO and founder of the company is Rajiv Gandhi. For the Q1FY20 ended June 2019, Hester Biosciences registers 11% sales growth in Q1FY20; Nepal unit registers 64% revenue growth, construction of Africa unit underway.

== Operations ==
Hester creates products including vaccines, drugs, feed supplements and disinfectants. They have a line of 45 poultry vaccines (live and inactivated), 4 large animal vaccines (live and inactivated), health products and diagnostics. Hester also provides seromonitoring for poultry farms and mastitis prevention programmers for cattle farms. The company owns and operates Asia's largest single-location animal biological manufacturing facility. Hester Biosciences also has an R&D unit at Kadi, and develops new animal vaccines, an example of which is the Goat Pox vaccine Live-Uttarkashi strain used in India. They have also partnered with Galvmed on vaccines for Newcastle disease.

The company is planning to increase its exports to the African region following good market potential and the need for animal vaccines in that region. Hester expects export revenues from Africa to increase to about 70 percent in the coming years from 40 to 45 percent currently. In the first nine months of the current fiscal, Hester's overall exports stood at Rs 12 crore, with Africa's share at 40-45 percent. Hester targets African market for poultry, animal healthcare products

In 2026, Ravin Gandhi resigned from the board of Hester, citing professional and personal commitments that prevent him from devoting sufficient time to company affairs.

== Recognition ==
In 2010 Hester Biosciences received "The Best Animal Vaccine Company" honor from The New Economy in the UK.

== See also ==
- Brucellosis Vaccine
- Goat Pox Vaccine
- Poultry disease
- FAO
