= One Small Hitch =

2012 film by John Burgess

- Theatrical released poster
- Directed by: John Burgess
- Written by: Dode B. Levenson
- Produced by: John Burgess; Brett Henenberg
- Starring: Shane McRae; Aubrey Dollar; Robert Belushi; Rebecca Spence; Heidi Johanningmeier; Ron Dean; Mary Jo Faraci; Janet Ulrich Brooks; Daniel J. Travanti
- Cinematography: Tari Segal
- Edited by: Ryan Koscielniak
- Distributed by: Freestyle Releasing
- Release dates: November 8, 2012 (CIFF); February 6, 2015
- Running time: 105 minutes
- Country: United States
- Language: English

One Small Hitch is a 2012 American romantic comedy film directed by John Burgess and written by Dode B. Levenson. Shane McRae stars as Josh Shiffman, who learns that his father is dying and his only regret is that he will not get to meet the woman who will one day become his son's wife. Desperate to fulfill his dad's final wish, Josh claims that he already met that woman, Molly Mahoney, who is played by Aubrey Dollar.

== Plot ==
Molly Mahoney is going home for her mother's wedding, and is bringing her boyfriend Lance to meet her family. Knowing they will be skeptical of him if she tells them he's in a band, she doesn't tell them anything about him, including his name. En route to the airport she discovers he's married and breaks up with him. At the airport, Molly meets up with Josh Shiffman, her brother's playboy best friend from childhood, as he is also flying from LA to Chicago for the wedding.

While waiting at the airport with Molly, Josh receives a call from his parents and learns that his dad, Max, is expected to die of cancer in the next 6 months. His father says that his only regret is not seeing the woman his son would marry. Josh, in a moment of panic, says that it is Molly. She agrees to play along for the weekend.

At Molly's mother's wedding, Josh reconnects with a former flame, Giselle Brousard. After telling her the truth about the fake engagement, they begin a friends with benefits relationship. While Molly says the relationship isn't a problem, she eventually begins to feel jealous of Giselle. Josh's parents ask Josh and Molly to stay longer to help with Josh's family's framing shop, as Max's health is failing. They agree, and the family starts to plan the wedding. Josh continues to see Giselle, and Molly tries to date other men.

One night, Josh is with his dad who asks him if he's happy with Molly, stating that being truly in love means you can be yourself with the other person. Josh replies that he is more comfortable with Molly than anyone else he knows. The same night, Molly attends her surprise bachelorette party where Molly describes Josh as one she could spend the rest of her life with. Josh overhears this and walks away in confusion before he is discovered. That night, they have sex. The next day, as they jokingly register for their wedding, Josh and Molly run into Giselle. Josh and Giselle flirt and Molly is upset.

Later, in front of their parents, Molly ends the engagement, saying she can't do this anymore. Josh chases after her and she admits that she loves him, returns his grandmother's ring, and leaves. Josh ends the "benefits" part of his relationship with Giselle and confesses he may love Molly.

Meanwhile, Josh's father has what the family thinks is a heart attack. Josh and Giselle rush to the hospital where Molly and the family are waiting. Josh's mother angrily reveals she knew he was having an affair and is horrified that he would bring Giselle to the hospital. Josh finally admits the truth; that he and Molly are not engaged.

After much yelling, Josh admits that he loves Molly. Molly, surprised, punches him. When Josh regains consciousness, he proposes to Molly. She accepts and they kiss. After a fade to black, we see Josh and Molly in the delivery room as they have their first baby. They name him Max.

== Cast ==
- Shane McRae as Josh Shiffman
- Aubrey Dollar as Molly Mahoney
- Daniel J. Travanti as Max Shiffman
- Janet Ulrich Brooks as Frida Shiffman
- Ron Dean as Art Burke
- Mary Jo Faraci as Doreen Mahoney
- Robert Belushi as Sean Mahoney
- Rebecca Spence as Carla Mahoney
- Heidi Johanningmeier as Giselle Brousard
- Jet Eveleth as Bridal Clerk

== Release ==
One Small Hitch premiered at the California Independent Film Festival on November 8, 2012.

It was released theatrically in the United States on February 6, 2015.

== Reception ==
The Radio Times rated it 2/5 stars and called it a "by-the-numbers romantic comedy".

=== Awards ===
- Best Picture Comedy – California Independent Film Festival (2012)
- Best Production Design – Hollywood Reel Independent Film Festival (2012)
- Best Picture Comedy – Cinequest (2013)
- Best Picture Comedy – Sedona International Film Festival (2013)
- Best Feature Film – Omaha Film Festival (2013)
- Audience Award – Bahamas International Film Festival (2013)
- Best Ensemble Cast – Chicago Comedy Film Festival (2013)
- Best Screenplay – L.A. Comedy Film Festival (2013)
- Best Director – Laugh Or Die Film Festival (2013)
- Best Director – Stony Brook Film Festival (2013)
- Rising Star – Naples International Film Festival (2013)
- Audience Award – Durango Film Festival (2014)
- Special Jury Commendation – Durango Film Festival (2014)
- Award of Excellence – Accolade Competition (2014)

== Soundtrack ==
1. "White Dress" – Ben Rector
2. "Cold Shoulders" – Gold Motel
3. "Spirit Of Waste" – Goodbye Satellite
4. "Little Horn" – Suns
5. "The Joker" – Ives The Band
6. "Hearts Don't Beat Right" – New Cassettes
7. "Take It Easy" – Francis
8. "Hymn 101" – Joe Pug
9. "421" – The Wildbirds
10. "Hiding – This Is Me Smiling
11. "Falling Apart" – The Sleeptalkers
12. "Beam Me Up" – Go Back To The Zoo
13. "Puppet" – Brian Lee
14. "Stay" – Dot Dot Dot
15. "Chupacabra" – Flatbed Orange
16. "Now The Rabbit Has The Gun" – Now The Rabbit Has The Gun
17. "For Your Love" – Marching Band
18. "Dope Fiend" – Jaime Wyatt
19. "Right Or Reason" – The Blissters
20. "Closer" – Sabrosa Purr
21. "Both Young & Wild" – Aktar Aktar
22. "Safe & Sound" – Capital Cities
23. "Poison & Wine" – The Civil Wars
24. "One Day" – Erin Martin
25. "Terrified" – Kevin Andrew Prchal
26. "Stockholm" – Brian McSweeney
27. "Jag Alskar Dig" – Volcanoes Make Islands
28. "Under Your Wings I'll Hide" – Immanu El
29. "This Is For You" – David Dunn
30. "Made in Hollywood" – Puppet
