= House of Harmony =

- Written by: Barbara Wood
- Directed by: Marco Serafini
- Starring: Fann Wong; Philippe Brenninkmeyer; Maggie Q Daniel Morgenroth; Cheng Pei-pei
- Theme music composer: Richard Blackford
- Countries of origin: Singapore; Germany
- Original languages: Mandarin; Spanish; German; English

Production
- Producers: Lim Suat Yen, Jason Lai
- Cinematography: Martinetti Gaetano
- Running time: 90 minutes (2 episodes each)
- Budget: SGD 7 million

Original release
- Release: 30 October 2005

House of Harmony (German: Das Haus der Harmonie) is a 2005 S$7 million German-Singaporean telemovie. Jointly produced by 4 parties - Germany's FFP Media and ZDF Pictures, together with Singapore's Oak 3 Films and Media Development Authority (MDA), the telemovie was shot in four languages - Spanish, English, German, and Mandarin.

It is based on the 1998 novel Perfect Harmony by Barbara Wood.

== Plot summary ==
Singapore in the 1920s sets the stage for the dramatic romance between a young Asian woman (Fann Wong) and a married American industrialist (Philippe Brenninkmeyer). It is a love doomed by laws and tradition, but which yields a child, Harmony (Maggie Q).

After finishing her studies, she goes to America and becomes a successful maker and distributor of herbal medicines. She also falls in love with her father's adopted son (Daniel Morgenroth), but is reviled by the young man's racially and socially bigoted mother. The story revolves around whether the two lovers could overcome all barriers and be together.

== Cast ==
- Fann Wong - Mei Ling
- Philippe Brenninkmeyer - Richard Barclay
- Maggie Q - Harmony
- Daniel Morgenroth - Gideon Barclay
- Monika Peitsch - Fiona Barclay
- Zhu Houren - Chang Suyin
- Cheng Pei-pei - Amah
- Claudine Wilde - Olivia Wilson
- Andrea Jonasson - Marie Larousse
- Jason Chan - Michael Lee
- Amy Cheng - Mrs. Wah

== Viewership ==
House of Harmony has been telecast in Germany, Austria, France and Belgium to a combined prime-time viewership of over 80 million.

== Awards ==
House of Harmony won a Silver Award in the 2005 Queensland Awards for Cinematography, by the Australian Cinematographers Society.
