= Robert Belushi =

American actor (born 1980)

- Born: Robert James Belushi; October 23, 1980 (age 45); Chicago, Illinois, U.S.
- Other name: Rob Belushi
- Occupation: Actor
- Years active: 1986–present
- Spouse: Chelsea Wernsman (m. 2014)
- Father: Jim Belushi
- Relatives: John Belushi (uncle)

Robert James Belushi (born October 23, 1980) is an American actor. In films, he is best known for his work on Sorority Row, One Small Hitch, and Valentine's Day. On television, he is best known as Allen ("The Buddy") on the third season of Spike TV's The Joe Schmo Show and Linus the Bartender on the ninth and final season of CBS's How I Met Your Mother. From 2020 to 2021, Belushi hosted the game show Get a Clue on Game Show Network.

== Early life and education ==
Robert James Belushi was born on October 23, 1980, in Chicago, Illinois. He is the son of Jim Belushi and Sandra Davenport, and the nephew of John Belushi. His half-siblings are Jamison Belushi and Jared Belushi. He is a 2004 graduate of Wesleyan University.

== Acting Credits ==
Year	Title	Role	Notes
1986	The Birthday Boy	Bobby Jr.	Short subject
2002–2009	According to Jim	Various	182 episodes
2008	The Temerity of Zim	Zim	Short subject
2008	The Christians	Jim	Movie
2009	RiffRaff	Otis Jay	Movie
2009	Legally Blondes	Waiter	Movie
2009	Dear Mr. Fidrych	Brian	Movie
2009	Sorority Row	Amazed Senior Guy	Movie
2010	Valentine's Day	Mailroom Ted	Movie
2011	The Defenders	A.D.A. Nicholson	4 episodes
2011	Cougars, Inc.	Shawn Fox	Direct-to-DVD Movie
2011	Cooper and Stone	A.J. Dunne	TV Movie
2012	The Men's Room		TV Movie
2012	Thunderstruck	Assistant coach Dan	Movie
2013–2014	How I Met Your Mother	Linus the Bartender	Recurring Role (11 episodes)
2013	Heebie Jeebies	Todd Crane	TV Movie
2013	One Small Hitch	Sean Mahoney	Movie
2013	The Joe Schmo Show	Allen ("The Buddy")	Main Cast (Season 3) (10 episodes)
2013	The Goodwin Games	Keith	2 episodes
2013	Single Siblings	Darren	2 episodes
2014	Devil's Due	Mason	Movie
2014	Agents of S.H.I.E.L.D.	Jimmy Mackenzie	2 episodes
2015	The Mentalist	Jimmy Lisbon	2 episodes
2015	Chicago P.D.	Landon Vanick	2 episodes
2016	Director's Cut	Elder Ashby	Movie
2018	Doubting Thomas	Alex	Movie
2018	Dylan	Dylan	Short subject
2020–2021	Get a Clue	Host	TV Game Show
2020	Witness Infection	Carlo	Movie
2021	Pretty Smart	Johnson	Episode: "Yikes! Grant asked Chelsea for a favor!"
TBA	Hacked: A Double Entendre of Rage Fueled Karma	TBA	Movie
