= Philippe Brenninkmeyer =

Dutch actor (born 1964)

- Born: 3 November 1964 (age 61)
- Occupation: Actor

Philippe Brenninkmeyer (born 3 November 1964) is a Dutch actor. In Germany he is known as Philipp Brenninkmeyer.

== Biography ==
Brenninkmeyer was born in Wimbledon, London. He is a member of the German-Dutch Brenninkmeijer family which founded the clothing store chain C&A. Brenninkmeyer attended boarding schools in Brighton, Meerbusch/Düsseldorf, the Aloisiuskolleg in Bonn, and Switzerland. He then worked for C&A in Cologne before deciding to become an actor.

He studied at the William Esper Studio in New York City from 1997–1999, where he appeared in productions of Macbeth and King Lear with the Frog & Peach Theater. Brenninkmeyer worked with the theatre company "Theatre Tribe" in Los Angeles, California in 2004. He has also studied theater in London, where he performed in the title role of Woyzeck at the Etcetera Theatre.

Brenninkmeyer first achieved success in Germany with the role of hotel manager Christian Dolbien in the German television series girl friends – Freundschaft mit Herz. He has also appeared in several other German shows and telemovies, as well as had supporting roles on the American shows Sex and the City, Law & Order, and Guiding Light. For the American comedy troupe Broken Lizard, Brenninkmeyer has played a Swinging German car thief in Super Troopers, a German beer tournament referee in Beerfest and a perturbed diner in The Slammin' Salmon. Brenninkmeyer starred as an American businessman in the German-Singapore movie House of Harmony opposite the Singaporean film star Fann Wong. He also appeared in the 2008 episode "The Jet Set" of Mad Men.

The actor speaks Dutch, English, French, and German. Brenninkmeyer currently has homes in Los Angeles and Berlin (Germany) and is married to the American actress Tara Lynn Orr.

== Filmography ==
=== Film ===
Year	Title	Role	Notes
1998	Breathe Safely	Chester De'ath "The Cripple Crusader"	
1999	Watershed	Lawyer	
1999	Jane	Maximillian	
2000	Striplings in the Night	Upset Man	Short
2000	Entourage	The Rock Star	
2001	Super Troopers	German Man	
2003	Strategy of Seduction	Max	TV movie
2004	The Cradle Will Fall	Dr. Edgar Highley	TV movie
2005	House of Harmony	Richard Barclay	TV movie
2006	Choking Man	Dutch Man	
2006	Beerfest	Herr Referee	
2008	Love a Dream	Charles Hamilton	TV movie
2009	The Slammin' Salmon	King Crab Customer	
2009	30 Karat Liebe	Percy van der Walt	TV movie
2009	Detektiv wider Willen	Wolf Bernheimer	TV movie
2010	Im Schatten des Pferdemondes	Dr. Eric Gustavson	TV movie
2010	Days of Forgiveness	Gray Sheridan	TV movie
2010	Love Shack	Oliver Snowden-Hicks	
2010	All Alone	Daniel	
2012	The Babymakers	Dr. Vickery	
2012	I Heart Shakey	Mattias Ober	
2013	RockBarnes: The Emperor in You	Mediator	
2013	Dark Circles	Michael	
2014	Seitensprung	Dr. Hansen	TV movie
2014	Reasonable Doubt	DA Jones	
2014	Bis Gleich	Father	Short
2015	He Said	Creighton	Short
2015	The Unforgiven	Mr. Black	Short
2016	Zazy	Maximillian Berg	
2016	Crossing Fences	Captain Harold	
2024	The Last Front	Maximilian Von Rauch	
2025	Marching Powder	Judge	

=== TV series ===
Year	Title	Role	Notes
1991	Screen One	Bartender	Series 3 Episode "Ex" (uncredited)
1999	Guiding Light	Martin	Unknown episodes
1999	Sex and the City	Bartender	S2 E11 "Evolution"
1999-2000	As the World Turns	Carter	E01.11142 E01.11229
2002	Law and Order	Andrew Skinner	S12 E23 "Oxymoron"
2002-2003	Love, Lies, Passions	Robert Fox	
2002-2007	Girl friends – Freundschaft mit Herz	Christian Dolbien	
2002-2011	Rosamunde Pilcher	Paul Gilmore & Robert	S1 E40 "Bis ans Ende der Welt" as Robert S1 E91 "Gefährliche Brandung" as Paul Gilmore
2005	Kanzleramt	Patrik Sheehan	S1 E07 "Schattenkrieger"
2007	Stubbe - Von Fall zu Fall	Professor Hardenberg	S1 E31 "Schmutzige Geschäfte"
2008	Im Tal der wilden Rosen	Henry Castleton	S3 E02 "Fluss der Liebe"
2008	Mad Men	Willy	S2 E11 "The Jet Set"
2008-2013	Inga Lindström	Marcus Hansen & Kristian Norden	S5 E03 "Sommer der Entscheidung" S11 E02 "Herz aus Eis"
2008-2015	Those Damn Canadians	Gunther Lipshitz	
2009	CSI: Miami	Clay Bennett	S8 E06 "Dude, Where's My Groom?"
2010	Undercovers	Karl	S1 E03 "Devices"
2011	Das Traumschiff	Kai Brückner	S1 E64 "Bora Bora"
2013	Ein Fall für zwei	Lars Diefenbach	S32 E05 "Schöner Sterben"
2013	Jimmy Kimmel Live!	Announcer	E10.356
2014	Stuttgart Homicide	Klaus Schatzschneider	S5 E24 "Die Tote auf dem Eis"
2014	Dr. Klein	Henry von Helmecke	S1 E06 "Dicke Luft"
2014	NCIS	Dapper Don & Alberto Velez	S12 E09 "Grounded"
2015	Tatort	Christian Ranstedt	S1 E943 "Der Himmel ist ein Platz auf Erden"
2015	NCIS: Los Angeles	Wayne Morris	S7 E08 "The Long Goodbye"
2016	Heldt	Jürgen Boll	S4 E06 "Bochum Singen und Sterben"
2016	Mondays	Creepy Kyle	S1 E01 "That Time When I Leaned In" S1 E08 "That Time When Kyle Gave Me the Creeps"

=== Video games ===
Year	Title	Role	Notes
2009	Wanted: Weapons of Fate	Unknown	Voice
