= Get a Clue (game show) =

American television game show (2020–2021)

- Genre: Game show
- Directed by: Hal Grant; Alan Wu
- Presented by: Rob Belushi
- Composers: Ian Honeyman and Vincent Ott
- Country of origin: United States
- Original language: English
- No. of seasons: 2
- No. of episodes: 130

Production
- Executive producers: Craig Brooks; Jeffery Breeden
- Producer: Dave Schapiro
- Production location: Caesars Entertainment Studios
- Editor: Ken Yankee
- Running time: 20–22 minutes
- Production company: Game Show Enterprises

Original release
- Network: Game Show Network
- Release: January 6, 2020 – April 16, 2021

Get a Clue is an American television game show hosted by Rob Belushi that aired on Game Show Network from January 6, 2020, to April 16, 2021.

== Gameplay ==
Two teams compete for a chance to win $10,000 by describing and guessing words similar to the main game of Pyramid. In the first season, each team consisted of four members, the second season, which premiered on January 4, 2021, reduced the teams to three members each.

=== Rounds 1 and 2 ===
Both teams get two turns per round. A category is announced (by the contestant's choice in season two), and one teammate is shown a word fitting it. That person must then describe the word to the next one in line, who tries to guess it. A correct guess scores 100 points and gives a new word to the guesser, who begins describing it for the next teammate in line. At any time, the describing contestant may pass the word to the next teammate, who immediately takes over describing it. If the same word is passed twice, an illegal clue is mentioned by the clue giver, or the guesser passes on the word and the clue giver gives an illegal clue, it is thrown out and a new word is given. The team in Round 1 has 30 seconds in season one (45 seconds in season two) to guess up to five words. In the second season, the receiver is only allowed one guess at each word, if an incorrect guess is given, the receiver is given a new word.

Each word in Round 1 is worth 100 points, and a 200-point bonus is awarded for guessing five words. These values are doubled in Round 2.

From season two, game play for Round 2 is altered. The team captain is given the choice of four categories and given a list of eight words to give to their two teammates. The captain is allowed to remove a word and the two other players have 60 seconds to guess the remaining seven words. If the players guess wrong three times on a single word, that word is taken out of play and the team must move on to the next word. Passing a word is not allowed. Like in Round 1, bonus points are given if seven out of eight words are guessed within the time limit of 60 seconds. Each team only gets to play one category in the revised Round 2.

=== Round 3: Choose Your Word ===
Each team gets one turn in this Round 3, choosing who will give and receive clues for 60 seconds. The giver chooses a word value of 200, 400, or 600 points, with higher-value words being more difficult, and must describe it. After a word is either guessed or passed, the giver chooses a new value (the giver may choose the same value as often as desired). When 15 seconds remain in the round, a 2,000-point word gets unlocked; however, the giver must immediately pass on or complete the current word in order to be able to select the word, and is only available to each team. Only 5 teams have correctly answered the 2,000 point word.

The team with the higher score after this round wins $1,000 and advances to the bonus round.

==== Tiebreaker ====
If the score is tied after Round 3, a tiebreaker is played in which the host reads a list of pre-written clues to a word. Either team captain may ring in at any time they think they know the answer. If they give the correct answer their team wins the game, but if they are incorrect, the other team automatically wins.

=== Bonus Round ===
The winning team has 60 seconds to go through as many words as possible. One member is chosen to describe the first word (indicated by the corner of their podium lighting up in the first season, and their entire podium lighting up orange in the second season), but the guesser is chosen at random from the others (indicated by their entire podium lighting up in the first season, and their entire podium lighting up green in the second season). A correct guess or pass transfers control to the guesser for the next word, and a new guesser is chosen at random. In addition, unlike the first two rounds, passing always gives out a brand new word (the same goes if an illegal clue is given or a player whose not taking a turn guessing calls out an answer). If the team correctly guesses eight words within 60 seconds, their winnings increase to $10,000; if not, they keep the previous $1,000 that they earned from the main game.
