= Heidi Johanningmeier =

American actor

- Born: July 29, 1982 (age 43); Mount Ayr, Iowa, U.S.
- Occupation: Actress
- Years active: 2005–present

Heidi Johanningmeier (born July 29, 1982) is an American actress. She has a recurring role as Charity in the television series Somebody Somewhere, which premiered in January 2022. She was nominated, along with the rest of the show, for a Peabody Award for Season 1. She has appeared in recurring roles on the television series Chicago P.D. and Proven Innocent, and was a lead in the film 100 Days to Live. She also had a main role in the film One Small Hitch.

== Life and career ==
Johanningmeier was inspired to become an actress after performing an individual performance project as Joan of Arc while in middle school. In 2006, Johanningmeier appeared in a production of Anton Chekhov's The Cherry Orchard at the Mark Taper Forum in Los Angeles alongside Annette Bening, Alfred Molina, Sarah Paulson and Frances Fisher.

In 2022, HBO's Somebody Somewhere and members of the cast, including Johanningmeier, were nominated for a Peabody Award.

For her role as the lead in the 2019 film 100 Days to Live, the film was awarded Best World Premiere at the San Diego International Film Festival.

For her role in the 2019 short film Her Story, Johanningmeier was awarded Best Actress at the 2019 Noida International Film Festival.

For her role in the 2013 film One Small Hitch, the film was awarded 72 nominations and won 72 film festival awards.

In May 2019, Johanningmeier participated in a SAG-AFTRA panel discussion about the misuse of deep fake technologies with Los Angeles Congressman Adam Schiff and actress Alyssa Milano after her likeness was used in a scene in a film without her permission.

== Filmography ==
Year	Title	Role	Notes
2005	Undiscovered		(Uncredited)
2007	Drip	Jessica	Short film
2008	CSI: NY	Girl in Film	Episode: "Page Turner"
2009	The Beast	Marla St. Clair	Episode: "Tilt"
2009	The Last Hurrah	Tara	
2009	Dream State	Lili	
2010	Neowolf	Rosemary	
2011	The Dilemma	Shoot the Puck Girl	
2011	Detroit 1-8-7	Margie Parker	Episode: "Motor City Blues"
2012	I Heart Shakey	Gabby Frankenfurter	
2012	Underemployed	Maggie	Episode: "The Focus Group"
2013	One Small Hitch	Giselle Brousard	
2014	Betrayal	Anna	Episode: “A Better Place”
2014–2017	Chicago P.D.	Jasmine	3 episodes
2015	Unexpected	Natalie	(Uncredited)
2017	Surprise Me!	Andrea	
2019	Shameless	Len	Episode: "The Apple Doesn’t Fall Far From the Alibi"
2019	The Last Summer	Phoebe's Mom	
2019	Proven Innocent	Linda Barrett	5 episodes
2019	100 Days to Live	Rebecca Church	
2019	Her Story	Natasha	Short film
2022-2023	Somebody Somewhere	Charity	9 episodes

=== Accolades ===
Year	Award	Category	Nominee(s)	Result	Ref.
2022	Peabody Awards	Entertainment	Somebody Somewhere	Nominated	
