= 100 Days to Live =

2019 film directed by Ravin Gandhi

- Theatrical release poster
- Directed by: Ravin Gandhi
- Written by: Ravin Gandhi
- Produced by: Ravin Gandhi; Christopher Jennings; Rhyan LaMarr
- Starring: Colin Egglesfield; Gideon Emery; Heidi Johanningmeier; Yancey Arias; Chris J. Johnson
- Cinematography: Nicholas M. Puetz
- Edited by: Ethan Maniquis
- Music by: Nima Fakhrara; Navid Hejazi
- Production companies: Power Law Productions; Red Guerilla Productions
- Distributed by: Cinedigm Entertainment Group; Artist View Entertainment; Amazon Prime
- Release dates: October 17, 2019 (San Diego International Film Festival); February 2, 2021
- Running time: 87 minutes
- Country: United States
- Language: English

100 Days to Live is a 2019 American crime thriller film written and directed by Ravin Gandhi. Heidi Johanningmeier stars as Dr. Rebecca Church, whose fiancé Gabriel Weeks (Colin Egglesfield) is kidnapped by a serial killer (Gideon Emery). It premiered at the 2019 San Diego International Film Festival and was released on digital platforms and DVD on February 2, 2021. 100 Days to Live was later acquired by Amazon Prime for a May 3, 2021 release.

== Plot ==
Dr. Rebecca Church (Heidi Johanningmeier) has devoted her life to suicide prevention after her mother killed herself when Rebecca was nine. After Rebecca's new fiancé Gabriel Weeks (Colin Egglesfield) is kidnapped, Rebecca finds a photo album entitled "Gabriel Was Saved". The police inform Rebecca that the perpetrator is a serial killer dubbed "The Savior", who stalks and photographs his victims for 100 days before kidnapping and executing them. Detective Jack Byers (Yancey Arias) informs Rebecca that the Savior is targeting people who have previously attempted suicide. Rebecca tells Jack that Gabriel attempted suicide after his wife and daughter died and came into her clinic for help. The next day, Gabriel asks Rebecca out, beginning a fast romance and subsequent proposal.

Rebecca discovers the Savior is a former suicide prevention colleague of hers named Victor Quinn (Gideon Emery) who blames himself for patients who killed themselves despite his efforts. Wracked with guilt, Victor shot himself and Rebecca assumed he was dead. The police discover that Victor recently applied for jobs as a suicide prevention counselor, proving he is alive. Rebecca confirms Gabriel had called a suicide prevention line, confirming how Victor is finding victims.

In her old files, Rebecca finds Victor's contact information and calls as he is driving with an unconscious Gabriel. Victor says he survived the gunshot, but was in a coma for 100 days, tortured by visions of dead patients. When Victor awoke, he met a suicidal woman named Barbara Roberts, who became his first victim. The police show Rebecca photo albums of Barbara and other victims who all had been stalked for 100 days. Victor calls Rebecca back, asking about Gabriel's personality before killing him. Rebecca learns that all of Victor's victims had recovered in the 100 days before he murdered them. Victor subdues Jack at the prevention clinic and chases Rebecca who escapes. Later, Rebecca admits to Jack that she had attempted suicide in her past, which seemingly explains why Victor is stalking her now.

Victor emails Rebecca recordings of phone calls between himself and Gabriel, proving he was counseling Gabriel throughout their relationship. Victor calls and taunts her by telling her the location of Gabriel's diary. From reading Gabriel's diary, Rebecca learns his wife and daughter died in a tragic swimming accident, leading to Gabriel's multiple suicide attempts. Unable to go through with it, he called a suicide prevention hotline. Victor picked Gabriel up and forced him at gunpoint to look at the photo albums of the previous victims who were happy. Victor explains the true nature of his philosophy: He offers to painlessly kill Gabriel in 100 days, while Victor takes photos to capture the "joy" he believes he is bestowing upon the suicidal. Rebecca learns that all of Victor's victims are, in fact, willing participants. Gabriel agreed to Victor's deal, but impulsively called Rebecca so he could "find love again."

Horrified by the revelation of the deal between Victor, Gabriel, and all of the other victims, Rebecca takes sleeping pills, and barely survives after being taken to a hospital. Rebecca tells Jack they will likely never catch Victor because he is providing a service that suicidal people want. Victor sneaks into the hospital, taunting Rebecca with details of Gabriel's decision, and offering to make her his next victim of assisted suicide. Upon release, her mental condition deteriorates further and Rebecca calls Victor to seemingly accept his offer.

However, Rebecca instead shoots Victor, who dies. Rebecca leaves evidence of her complicity at the murder scene for Jack, who decides not to pursue her. Rebecca drives away, still struggling but confident in her resolve to never kill herself.

== Cast ==
- Colin Egglesfield as Gabriel Weeks
- Gideon Emery as Victor Quinn
- Heidi Johanningmeier as Rebecca Church
- Yancey Arias as Jack Byers
- Chris J. Johnson as Greg Neese
- Charin Alvarez as Louisa
- Sarah Brooks as Tanya Williams
- Nathaniel Buescher as Max
- Tai Davis as Nurse Melody
- Ravin Gandhi as Harry Park
- Torrey Hanson as Gil Church
- Maura Kidwell as Maggie
- Sarah Loveland as Sarah Weeks

== Production ==
100 Days to Live is the debut film from Ravin Gandhi, an entrepreneur who shot the film across three weeks in Chicago while working in his job as the CEO of GMM Nonstick Coatings. For many years Gandhi had written screenplays as a hobby. Much of the film was shot inside and outside Gandhi's apartment building and in his neighborhood. Gandhi told Fox Chicago and Windy City Live that he was extremely surprised by its festival success, subsequent acquisition and release. Gandhi told NBC Philadelphia that the success of 100 Days to Live has inspired him to continue making films.

== Release ==
100 Days to Live premiered at the San Diego International Film Festival on October 17, 2019. The film won Best World Premiere and Best First Time Director for Ravin Gandhi at the festival. It was released to VOD services and DVD by Cinedigm Entertainment Group on February 2, 2021, followed by a release on Amazon Prime on May 3, 2021.

== Reception ==
=== Critical response ===
On review aggregator website Rotten Tomatoes, the film holds an approval rating of 100%, based on eight reviews. Alan Ng of Film Threat called the film "a damn good thriller" and wrote, "The film is quite a fantastic feat for a mid-budget indie." Writing for the Chicago Sun-Times, Richard Roeper gave the film 3 out of 4 stars, calling it "a well-filmed and ambitiously creative first effort from writer-producer-director Ravin Gandhi" and praised Gandhi "for following his movie dreams and turning in an impressive debut." Brian Tallerico from RogerEbert.com wrote, "It's not perfect but it offers a quick-paced escapism that makes me wonder what Gandhi might do with more time and money." Richard Whittaker from The Austin Chronicle wrote, "There's a dark strand to the script that makes 100 Days to Live stand out from a lot of less aspirational twisted thrillers." Cynthia Vinney from Film Racket had a similar assessment of the film, stating, "100 Days to Live contains several unexpected twists and turns, making it a surprising - and surprisingly rich- experience." Federico Furzan from Screentology said the film was "a gut-punch that will leave you speechless." On Metacritic, the film has a weighted average score of 62 out of 100, based on four critics, indicating "generally favorable" reviews.

=== Anti-suicide message ===
The film has been praised for its focus on mental health and depression. Aunyea Lachelle of NBC Philadelphia said, "the new psychological thriller 100 Days to Live is taking a different approach to diving deep into the ups and downs of dealing with depression." Ojinika Obiekwe on The CW said, "This film will definitely have you on the edge of your seat. But it also brings audiences into a world of suicide prevention and mental health." Danielle Nottingham from NBC Los Angeles said, "we're talking about suicide prevention, and you don't always see that discussed on the big screen." Amy Mackelden for Nicki Swift wrote, "While 100 Days to Live explores the reasons a person might attempt suicide, it also focuses on recovery and the people who provide support in the aftermath. It's unusual to find a thriller that explores suicide with such a delicate hand and asks tough questions about mental health."

== Accolades ==
List of accolades received by 100 Days to Live
Year	Award	Category	Recipients	Result
2019	San Diego International Film Festival	Best World Premiere		Won
2019	San Diego International Film Festival	Best First Time Director	Ravin Gandhi	Won
2019	San Diego International Film Festival	Best Feature Film		Nominated
2019	San Diego International Film Festival	Best Thriller Feature		Nominated
2022	Film Threat's Award This!	Best Indie Action/Thriller		Nominated
