= Mary Catherine Garrison =

American actress

- Garrison in 2026
- Born: December 19, 1973 (age 52); Clarksdale, Mississippi, U.S.
- Education: University of Evansville (BFA); University of California, San Diego (MFA)
- Occupation: Actress
- Spouse: Marshall Wood

Mary Catherine Garrison (born December 19, 1973) is an American actress known for her roles in Veep and Somebody Somewhere.

== Early life and education ==
Born in Clarksdale, Mississippi, Garrison earned a Bachelor of Fine Arts degree in acting from the University of Evansville and a Master of Fine Arts in acting from the University of California, San Diego.

== Career ==
In addition to her television and film roles, Garrison has also appeared in Broadway productions of The Man Who Came to Dinner, Assassins, Rabbit Hole, Top Girls, Accent on Youth, and Lend Me a Tenor.

== Personal life ==
Garrison and her husband, Marshall Wood, live in Lynchburg, Virginia. She previously lived in Los Angeles and Brooklyn. In addition to acting, Garrison operates an online pottery business.

== Filmography ==
=== Film ===
| Year | Title | Role | Notes |
|---|---|---|---|
| 1999 | 8mm | Girl in Eddie Poole's office | Uncredited |
| 2002 | Moonlight Mile | Caroline | |
| 2002 | Flowers | Anna | |
| 2003 | How to Deal | Ashley Martin | |
| 2013 | The Caterpillar's Kimono | Marion | |
| 2013 | Begin Again | Jill | |
| 2017 | Easy Living | Trish | |
| 2018 | The Land of Steady Habits | Sandy | |
| 2020 | Let Them All Talk | Customer | |
| 2026 | A Statement | Jeanne Malchon | |

=== Television ===
| Year | Title | Role | Notes |
|---|---|---|---|
| 1996 | The Big Easy | Alana Fontaine | Episode: "A Dead Man Is Hard to Find" |
| 2001 | Law & Order | Claire Jarrell | Episode: "Bronx Cheer" |
| 2001 | Third Watch | Mrs. Knowlins | Episode: "Honor" |
| 2008 | Lipstick Jungle | Lily Mason | Episode: "Chapter Nine: Help!" |
| 2009 | Flight of the Conchords | | Episode: "New Cup" |
| 2009 | 30 Rock | Erin | Episode: "Jackie Jormp-Jomp" |
| 2009 | The Good Wife | Carol Demory | Episode: "Fixed" |
| 2013–2019 | Veep | Sophie Brookheimer | 7 episodes |
| 2016 | Good Behavior | Robin | Episode: "Only the Best for Mrs. Diaz" |
| 2018 | Mommy Blogger | Iris | Episode: "Shanti Shanti" |
| 2022–2024 | Somebody Somewhere | Tricia Miller | Series regular |

== Accolades ==
| Year | Award | Category | Nominee(s) | Result | Ref. |
|---|---|---|---|---|---|
| 2022 | Peabody Awards | Entertainment | Somebody Somewhere | Nominated | |
