= Ravin Gandhi =

American businessman

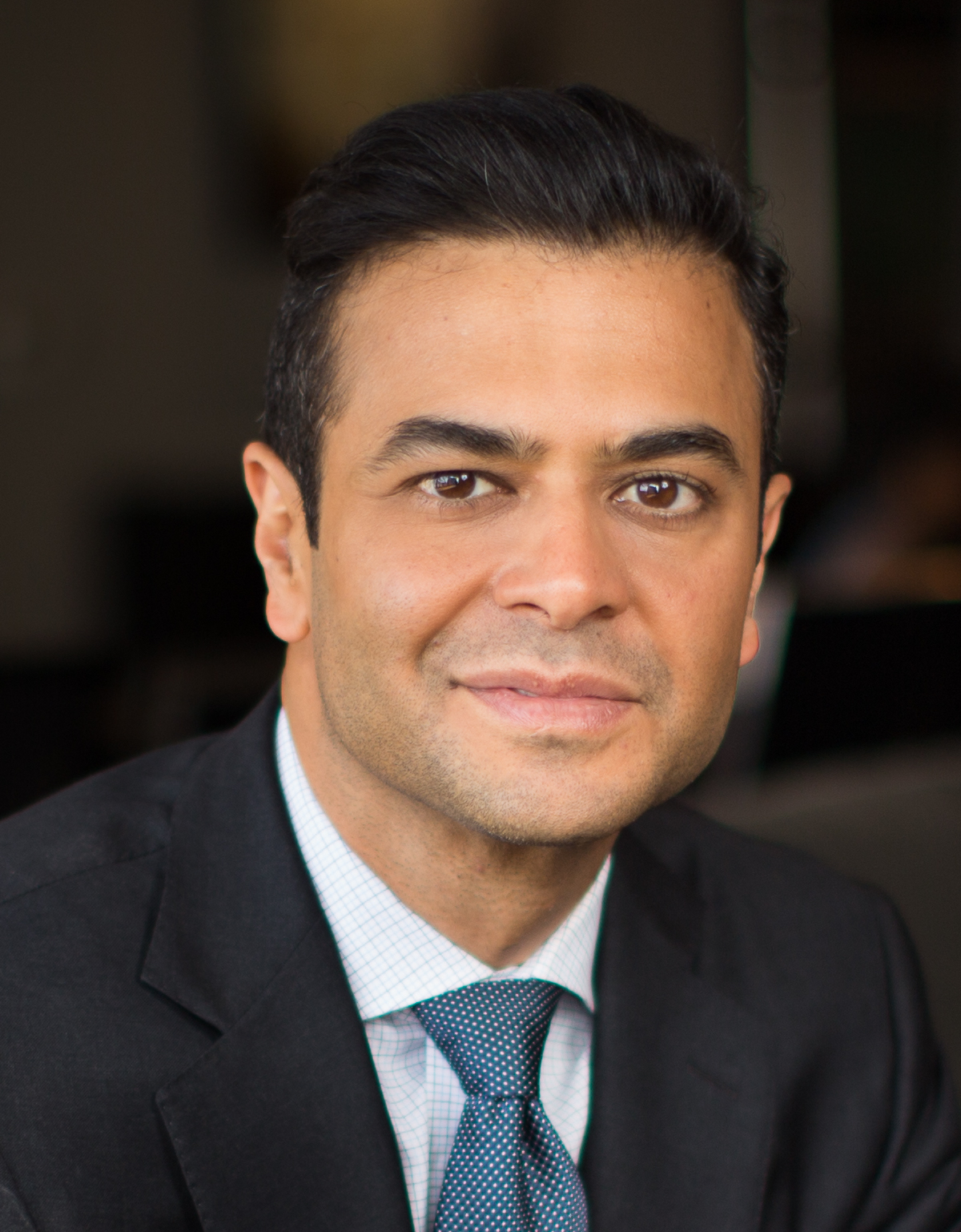
- Gandhi in 2017
- Born: 1973 (age 52–53); Waukegan, Illinois, United States
- Education: University of Illinois at Urbana–Champaign (BS); Kellogg Graduate School of Management (MBA)
- Occupation: CEO
- Political party: Democratic (-2024); Republican (2024-present)
- Spouse: Sonal Gandhi
- Children: 2

Ravin Gandhi (born 1973) is an American businessman. Gandhi was an executive with Coatings and Chemicals Corporation before its sale to Akzo Nobel. He later founded Glenborn Partners, a private equity firm, and GMM Nonstick Coatings, where he remained its CEO after its 2016 sale to Showa Denko.

== Early life and education ==
Ravin Gandhi was born in Waukegan, Illinois in 1973. He graduated from Glenbrook South High School in 1990, graduated from University of Illinois at Urbana–Champaign in 1994, and became a CPA. Gandhi received his MBA from the Kellogg Graduate School of Management in 2000.

== Career ==
Gandhi began his career in 1994 working as a chartered accountant at KPMG Consulting, before joining his father's company Coatings and Chemicals Corporation. Gandhi eventually engineered the company's sale to Akzo Nobel in 1998. Following the sale, he became President of Akzo Nobel Nonstick Coatings. In 2002, he founded Glenborn Partners, a private equity firm. In 2007, Gandhi founded GMM Nonstick Coatings, following the end of his non-compete clause with Akzo Nobel. GMM became one of the world's largest suppliers of non-stick coatings, and was acquired by Showa Denko KK in 2016. Following the sale, Gandhi remained the CEO of GMM, and in 2019 led the acquisition by SDK of ILAG nonstick coatings. In 2024, Gandhi stepped down from GMM.

As an investor, Gandhi is also an investor in Hester Biosciences, Throne Labs, Apptronik, and the first investor in KeyMe. He is also a commentator on CNBC, CNN, Bloomberg, Fox Business, Fox News, and MSNBC, and a contributor to Fortune, Inc. Magazine, and Entrepreneur.

In 2026, Gandhi resigned from the board of Hester Biosciences, citing professional and personal commitments that prevent him from devoting sufficient time to company affairs.

== Filmmaking ==
Gandhi wrote and directed the 2021 crime thriller film 100 Days to Live. Much of the film was shot over three weeks inside and outside Gandhi's apartment building and in his neighborhood while he remained CEO of GMM Nonstick Coatings. 100 Days to Live had its world premiere at the 2019 San Diego International Film Festival, where it won Best World Premiere and Best First Time Director for Ravin Gandhi. Cinedigm Entertainment Group released 100 Days to Live on Apple TV, Amazon, DirectTV, Xfinity, DISH, Google Play, iTunes, YouTube, and other digital platforms and DVD and Blu-ray on February 2, 2021, followed by a release on Amazon Prime on May 3, 2021.

== Personal life ==
Gandhi was a critic of Donald Trump during the 2016 Presidential election, and in 2017 his criticisms made national news when an oped he wrote resulted in a racist backlash, including racist emails, tweets, and voicemails. He wrote his piece in reaction to the Charlottesville incident. Gandhi also serves on the board of City Year Chicago.

Gandhi was honored as the 2021 Distinguished Alumnus at Glenbrook South High School. In 2022, Gandhi created and funded a program to boost parental involvement at Andrew Cooke Magnet Elementary School in Waukegan, Illinois which he attended as a child. In 2025, Gandhi was honored at the City Year Ripples of Hope Gala for his dedication to education.

Gandhi revealed that he had left the Democratic Party in 2024, citing the leftward shift of the party. In August 2025, he told Fox News, "I was a 20-year Democrat. I voted for every Democratic president, including Joe Biden. After 20 years, in 2024 I voted for President Trump. The reason is when I saw what Biden did on the border, with wokeism, with decriminalizing crime, and most importantly, the socialism I see coming out of the Democratic Party. There are so many centrists like me who feel we did not leave the Democratic Party - the Democratic Party left us. Democrats just nominated an actual socialist to be the Mayor of New York City. That is insane. I think the Democratic Party has a lot of soul-searching to do, because it's lost a lot of people like me who were with them for decades." Gandhi has since publicly spoken favorably about Trump's economic policies.
