= Yancey Arias =

American actor (born 1971)

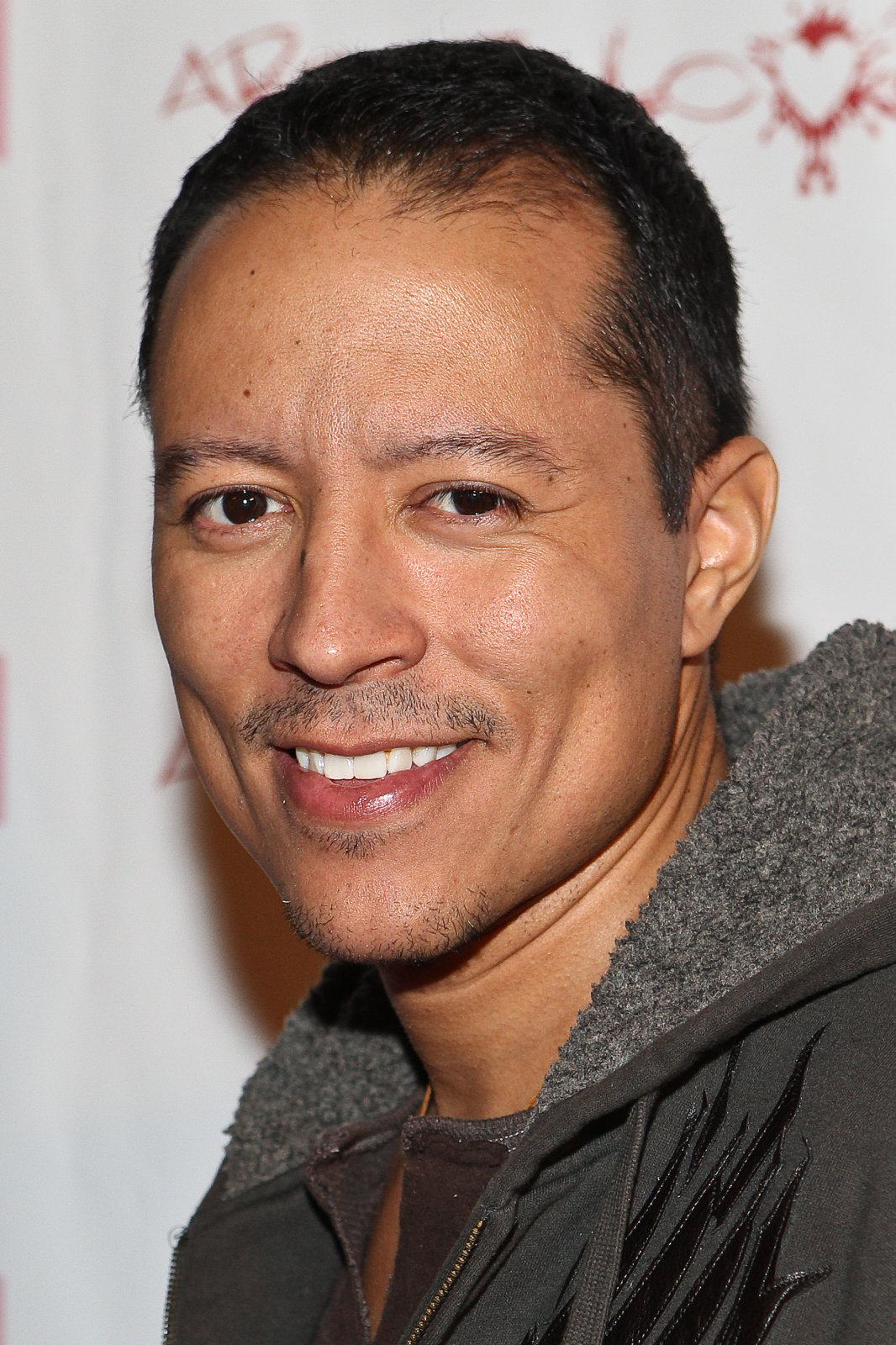
- Arias in 2010
- Born: June 27, 1971 (age 54); New York City, New York, U.S.
- Occupations: Film, television, stage actor
- Years active: 1992–present
- Spouse: Anna Alvim (m. 2002)
- Website: http://www.yanceyarias.com

Yancey Arias (born June 27, 1971) is an American actor. He played Miguel Cadena in the NBC series Kingpin and Gabriel Williams in the FX series Thief.

== Life and career ==
Born and raised in New York City to a Puerto Rican mother, Miriam, and a Colombian father, Tony, Arias attended Moore Catholic High School and St. John's Preparatory School before studying theater at Carnegie Mellon University. Arias attended Stagedoor Manor, a performing arts summer camp.

His first big break came in the Broadway production of Miss Saigon in 1992, which he worked on in different capacities for several years. In addition to television roles, he also continued to work on stage, including a starring role in The Wild Party in 2000.

In 2001, he moved to Los Angeles, where he lives with his wife, actress Anna Alvim. He was on the show Knight Rider for the first half season. In 2004, he played little DeeDee's (actress Essence Atkins) love interest on the sitcom Half & Half.

In July 2013, it was announced that Arias would play Carl Villante, the head of an elite investigative unit, in the ABC series Castle. He appears in the film Cesar Chavez.

In 2017, Arias played Colonel Cortez in USA's hit series Queen of the South. In 2025, Arias played Neto in The Cleaning Lady.

== Filmography ==
Year	Title	Role	Notes
1992	Innocent Blood	Coroner's Assistant	
1997	Dead Men Can't Dance	Sixkiller	
1997	Destination Unknown	Rico	
1998	Crossfire	Hernandez	
1999	The Sopranos	Eduardo Arnaz	
2001	Home Invaders	Angel	
2002	The Time Machine	Toren	
2003	Kingpin	Miguel Cadena	
2007	Live Free or Die Hard	Agent Johnson	
2008	Hotel California	Hector	
2009	Street Dreams	Tim Cabrera	
2010	Legion	Estevez	
2010	Undocumented	Alberto Fuentes	
2011	America	Correa	
2011	Revenge	Senator Kingsly	
2015	Tag	Edmund	
2015	The Outfield	Charles	
2016	Hands of Stone	Benny Huertas	
2016	Restored Me	Roger Escalante	
2017	Secrets of Deception	Detective Reyes	
2017	Queen of the South	General Cortez	
2018	Canal Street	DJ Wado	
2018	Bella's Story	Marco	
2018	God's Eye	Marcos	
2019	Bottom of the 9th	Billy	
2019	100 Days to Live	Jack Byers	
2021	Switched Before Birth	Gabe Ramirez	
2021	13 Minutes	Carlos	
2022	North of the 10	David	

== See also ==
- List of Puerto Ricans
