= KeyMe =

American key duplication company

KeyMe Locksmiths
- KeyMe Locksmiths logo 2020
- Type: Private
- Industry: Locksmith
- Founded: 2012; 14 years ago
- Headquarters: New York, New York, U.S.
- Key people: Greg Marsh (Founder); James Moorhead (CEO)
- Website: www.key.me

KeyMe Locksmiths is a technology company that provides robotic kiosks for new key duplication, locksmith services, and an app for copying keys.

== Company history ==
The company was founded by Greg Marsh in 2012, who developed the idea after he had a difficult experience getting his home's locks changed. Marsh now serves as the company's CEO. The company is based in New York City.

== Key duplication ==
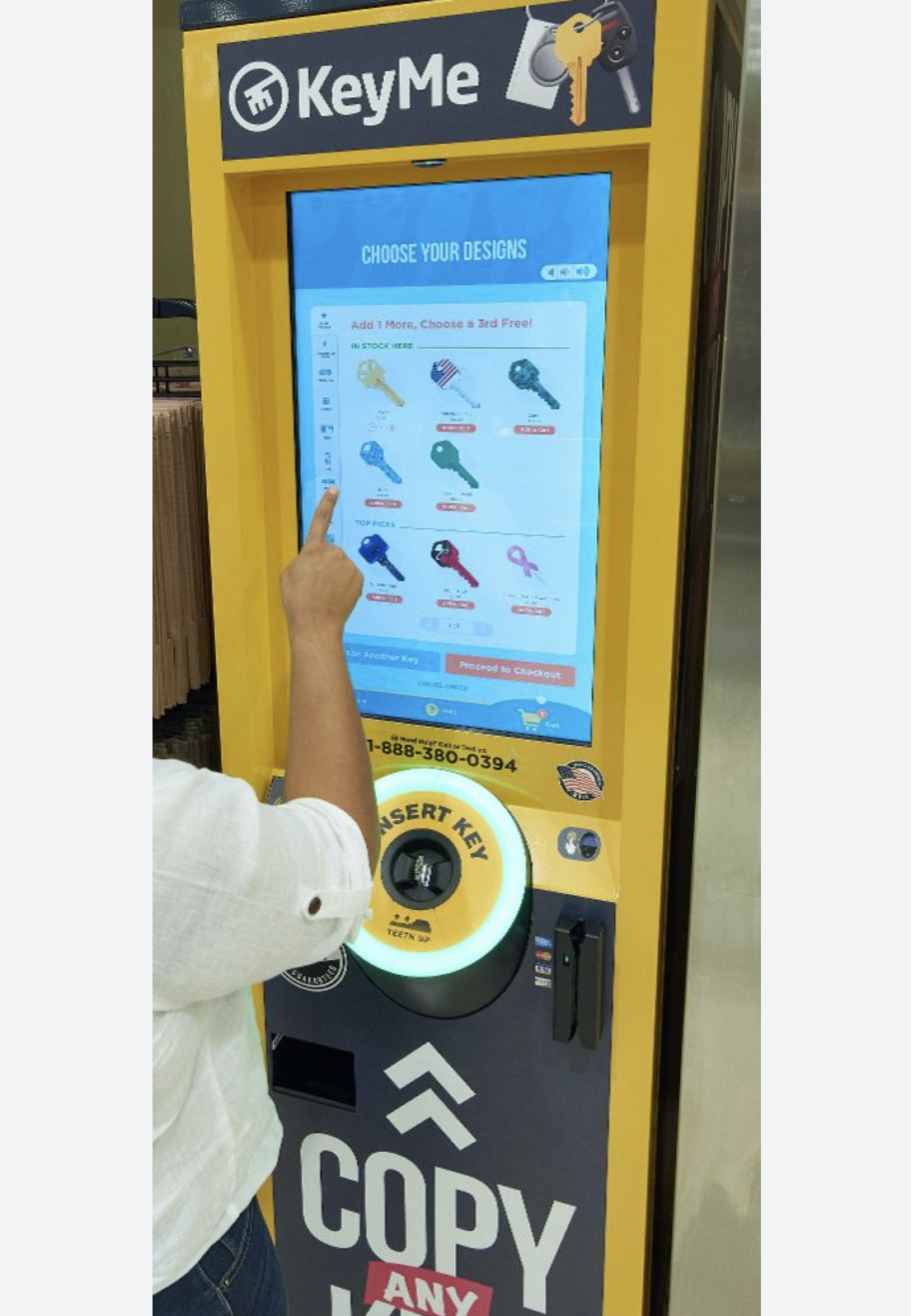
KeyMe kiosk

KeyMe Locksmiths uses computer vision and artificial intelligence to capture key information in a kiosk. The company trained neural networks on thousands of key types, creating a first-of-its-kind method for classifying keys. The company's hardware and software can support 50 times as many key types as traditional systems.

KeyMe's mobile app at one time, had users digitally scan their keys, the scans of which were then stored in the cloud. That data was then sent to physical kiosks, where new copies of those keys could be fabricated. Kiosks can also scan keys inserted directly into a scanning apparatus. The machinery in the kiosks can quickly reproduce brass keys, key fobs, and car keys both with and without transponders. The kiosks are located in various cities across the United States, generally alongside a box retailer, grocery store, or corner store. Originally kiosks would only allow access to keys via a finger print scan. Keys can also be delivered by mail.

Some commentators have mentioned concerns that the app could potentially allow people to copy keys other than their own, since only a few seconds of physical access to a key is required to scan it. The number of KeyMe kiosks in 2016 was about two hundred, which had fabricated about one million keys at that time. By 2025, the company had over 7,000 kiosks in retailers such as Kroger, Ikea, Wal-Mart, Menards, and Rite Aid.

In 2021, a jury in Marshall, Texas unanimously concluded that KeyMe did not infringe any patent claims of The Hillman Group, which had sued KeyMe in the United States District Court for the Eastern District of Texas. US District Judge James Rodney Gilstrap presided over the trial.

== Locksmith Services and Media ==
In 2020, KeyMe Locksmiths expanded to offer locksmith services for residential, commercial, and vehicle locksmith servicing needs. Services include lockout assistance, key replacement, lock installation, and lock repairs.

In 2021, KeyMe Locksmiths launched a retail media network. By 2025, this network generated over 2 billion advertising impressions on its kiosks' touch-screens, and over 1.4 billion monthly impressions, connecting consumers to brands who are seeking to advertise in-store.

== Funding ==
KeyMe Locksmiths raised $300K in angel funding from Ravin Gandhi in 2012. KeyMe raised $2.3 million in seed funding in 2013 from Battery Ventures and then another $7.8 million in its Series A funding round in 2014. In 2016 the company received $20 million in Series B venture financing, a round led by Comcast Ventures and including investors 7-Eleven and Ravin Gandhi. The company then raised $15 million in their Series C round and $25 million in their Series D round. The company received $50 million in further funding in 2019 and $35 million in 2020.
