= I Heart Shakey =

- Directed by: Kevin Cooper
- Written by: Kevin Cooper; Eric J. Stolze
- Produced by: DeAnna Cooper; Taejung Lee
- Starring: Steve Lemme; Steve Guttenberg; Beverly D'Angelo; Alfonso Arau; Rylie Behr
- Cinematography: Steven Parker
- Edited by: Leonard Wilkes
- Music by: Misha Segal
- Production company: Amarok Productions
- Distributed by: Phase 4 Films
- Release date: June 29, 2012
- Running time: 93 minutes
- Country: United States
- Language: English

I Heart Shakey is a 2012 American family comedy film written and directed by Kevin Cooper. The story is about a widower, his 10-year-old daughter, and their dog, Shakey. The family moves from the smaller city of Toledo, Ohio, to the big city of Chicago. Upon arriving, they discover that they cannot keep their dog and must find him a new home. The film stars Steve Lemme, Steve Guttenberg, Beverly D'Angelo, and Alfonso Arau.

== Plot ==
Widower J.T. O'Neil and his daughter, Chandler, move from Toledo, Ohio, to Chicago so he can pursue his dream of becoming a master chef. The O'Neils, who have their faithful dog, Shakey, accompany them, arrive at their big city high-rise only to discover that dogs are strictly forbidden on the premises. Forced to kennel Shakey or lose their deposit, J.T. and Chandler are depressed—until their dog manages to find himself back at the apartment building. After trying to hide Shakey from the nosy building super and the dog-hating manager, Chandler realizes that she should try to change the unfair rules, not just continue to break them.

== Cast ==
- Steve Lemme as J.T. O'Neil
- Steve Guttenberg as Stubbs
- Beverly D'Angelo as Sheila
- Alfonso Arau as Raoul
- Rylie Behr as Chandler O'Neil
- Ebony as Shakey
- Philippe Brenninkmeyer as Mattias Ober
- Heidi Johanningmeier as Gabby Frankenfurter
- Walt Sloan as Board Member
- Michael Yurchak as Flavio
- Dante Brown as Andrew
- Sean Giambrone as Toledo Kid #3
- Dusan Brown as Dash
- Greg Hollimon as Cop #1
- Andy Luther as Cop #2
- Brenda Pickleman as Beatrice Carmichael
- Janet Ulrich Brooks as Estelle Willinger
- Peter Fitzsimmons as Homeless Man
- Rylie Behr as Chandler O'Neil
- Roslyn Alexander as Mrs. Ellrich
- Andy St. Clair as Oskar Jerski
- Billy Dec as Party Patron
- J.W. Dean as Banana Cream Pie Waiter (as Joel Wiersema)
- Lena Dansdill as Bath Tub Attendant #1
- Manish Shah as Board Member #6
- Sandy Gulliver as Board Member
- Eileen Montelione as Stephanie
- Raminder Chadha as Sanjay's Father
- Matthew Bender as Chef
- Lanny Lutz as Harold Carmichael
- Caitlin Camp as Woman #1 in Restaurant
- Kara Garland as School Child
- Noel Joseph as Sanjay
- Sharon Kluge as Grandma
- Erin Payton as Karen
- Caroline Franklin as Board Room Orchestra #1
- Tom Sargent as Additional Ober Chef #3
- Kenneth Gregory Cook as Board Member #3
- Joshua Brokopp as Toledo Kid #1
- Paul B. Payne as Chuck
- Ericka Johnson as Luau Hawaiian Guest
- Max Zuppa as Sergei Demonic
- Megan Lacey as Restaurant Patron #4
- Nathan Ayala as Board Member #2
- Pete Fitzsimmons as Vampire
- Timothy Tamisiea as Boo the Clown
- Jackson Cooper as Pie Thrower
- Mike Falevits as Godfather
- Tom Cloud as Man in CBW lobby
- Mackenzie Relihan as Extra
- Thayer Cooper as Toledo Kid #2
- Julie Relihan as Extra
- Charlie Ramsey as Board Member #5
- Ray Duran as Waiter #2
- Andy Rigrod as Board Room Chef #4
- Allison Lacey as Patron #2 in Restaurant
- Alyssa Urgo as Toledo Kid #6
- Dianna Noun as Bath Tub Attendant #2
- Kathleen Gough as Woman #1 in CBW lobby
- Louis Canepa as Waiter #3
- Shawn Block as Waiter
- Ziandra Torrico as Waiter #7
- Lori Ruth Cook as Board Member
- Paul Kolosoki as Waiter #5
- Frances Cabeen as Storyteller
- Ben Mostowfi as Board Member #4
- Sarah J. Gough as Waiter #4
- Carol Rigrod as Guest #1
- Jerry M. Miller as Farmer
- Andy Carey as Vampire #2
- Robert Stauber as Board Room Orchestra #3
- Matthew Sargent as Additional Ober Chef #4
- Kiu Mostowfi as Restaurant Patron #5
- Terry Gehring as Patron #1 in Restaurant
- Justin Frommelt as Red-Headed Boy
- Michelle Reed as Additional Ober Chef #2
- Jordan Ingram as Sergei's Thug #2
- Stacey Smith as Farmer's Wife
- Laraine Baker as Board Room Chef #1
- Blake Cline as Board Room Chef #3
- Maxim Strzelecki as Toledo Kid #5
- Joelle Mologousis as Toledo Kid #4
- Joshua Love as Sergei's Thug #3
- Sam Alexander as Mr. Ellrich
- Sue Purdom as Woman #2 in the CBW lobby
- Nora Xavier as Sanjay's Mother
- Deshon Triplett as Additional Ober Chef #1
- Karen Emma Anderson as Guest #2
- John Sorensen as Sergei's Thug #4
- Keith Lacey III as Patron #3 in Restaurant
- Philip Cameli as Sergei's Thug #1
- Brandon M. Tisby as Board Room Chef #5
- Jeff Piszczek as Board Room Orchestra #2
- Mireille Baldwin Payne as Woman #2 in Restaurant
- Scott D. Pellock as Board Room Chef #6
- Sydney Relihan as Extra (uncredited)

== Reception ==
Sandie Angulo Chen of Common Sense Media gave the film two stars out of five, saying that the film's premise was "promising [but] predictable." She criticized Janet Ulrich Brooks' character, describing it as "the devilish subtlety that Imelda Staunton brought to her role as Professor Dolores Umbridge in Harry Potter, but instead she's depicted as an even more deranged Cruella De Vil (obviously) who bulges her eyes like the Bride of Frankenstein." She also, in contrast, praised the two leading roles, Lemme and Behr, commenting "good enough actors to make their pitiful situation believable." However, she noted, "the movie has far too many manic, exaggerated characters to be enjoyable when Lemme and Behr have to share the screen with them."
