= Virtualtourist =

Travel-oriented community website

VisualTourist
- Available in: English
- Dissolved: February 27, 2017; 9 years ago
- Launched: January 2000; 26 years ago
- Current status: Offline

VT member meet in Kraków

Old logo

VirtualTourist (VT) was a free online travel guide and social networking service. The website had over 1.3 million members, which contributed to sharing 3.7 million photos and posted 1.8 million travel tips for over 70,000 locations. Members were able to rate each other's tips by accuracy and helpfulness. Each member had a "VT rank" based on the ratings of their tips.

== Overview ==
Some members attended meetings, which often included over 100 participants. The company also provided "Top 10 lists" based on rankings by its members, including "10 of world's most unusual foods", "Top 10 European Cities To See Now", and "Best Street Art". The site earned honors including recommended travel forum by Time, a favorite website by Newsweek, and one of the 35 best travel sites by Travel + Leisure.

== History ==
The origin of Virtualtourist is found in a project at the University of Buffalo to provide a Web-based map of all servers on the Internet. This project was nominated for “Best Navigation Aid” at the Best of the Web Awards at the First International Conference on the World-Wide Web.

In 1996, Brandon Plewe at the University of Buffalo registered “Virtual Tourist” as a trademark in the US, but abandoned the trademark in 1997. Shortly thereafter, two German computer science students, Tilman Reissfelder and Thorsten Kalkbrenner at the University of Karlsruhe, registered the URL.

By 1999, Reissfelder and Kalkbrenner had a site with a few hundred city locations with travel links that people could add to and which would reference their user profiles. The site, which had links about “Hotels, Restaurants, Things to Do”, received 1.5 million page views per month from about 500,000 unique visitors. J.R. Johnson, an American attorney, teamed up with Reissfelder and Kalkbrenner, moved the company to the US, raised money, with Reissfelder as CTO and Johnson as CEO.

The website launched in January 2000 at the peak of the dot-com bubble. In 2007, the company launched VirtualTourist Travel Guides, printed guidebooks composed almost entirely of user-generated content. In July 2008, VirtualTourist.com, Inc. and sister site Onetime were acquired by Expedia Group (then owner of TripAdvisor) for $85 million. In September 2012, the company announced a partnership whereby it would provide perks to travelers with Contiki Tours who posted about their experiences on the website.

Effective February 27, 2017, the site was shut down by its parent company due to "declining engagement".
