= Barbara Wood =

American novelist

- Born: January 30, 1947 (age 79); Warrington, Lancashire, England
- Occupation: Novelist
- Writing career
- Pen name: Barbara Wood, Kathryn Harvey
- Period: 1978–present
- Genres: Romance; historical

Barbara Wood (born January 30, 1947, in Warrington, in Lancashire, England) is a writer of historical romance novels. She and her family moved to California, where she grew up. In 2002, she received the Corine Literature Prize.

== Bibliography ==
=== As Barbara Wood ===
- Hounds and Jackals, 1978
- The Magdalene Scrolls, 1978
- Curse this House, 1978
- Yesterday's Child, 1979
- Night Trains, 1979
- Childsong, 1981
- The Watch Gods, 1981
- Domina, 1983
- Vital Signs, 1985
- Soul Flame, 1987
- Green City in the Sun, 1988
- The Gifts of Peace, 1990
- The Dreaming, 1991
- Virgins of Paradise, 1993
- The Prophetess, 1996
- Perfect Harmony, 1998
- Sacred Ground, 2001
- The Blessing Stone, 2003
- Star of Babylon, 2005
- The Last Shaman, 2007
- Woman of a Thousand Secrets, 2008
- This Golden Land, 2010
- The Divining, 2012
- The Serpent and the Staff, 2013
- Rainbows on the Moon, 2016
- Land of the Afternoon Sun, 2016

=== As Kathryn Harvey ===
- Butterfly, 1989
- Stars, 1993 ((2010) ISBN 978-0595347797 LCCN 2012-6387)
- Private Entrance, 2005

== Filmography ==
German TV films

- Barbara Wood: Herzflimmern (1998, based on Vital Signs)
- Barbara Wood: Traumzeit (2001, based on The Dreaming)
- Barbara Wood: Spiel des Schicksals (2002, based on Hounds and Jackals)
- Barbara Wood: Lockruf der Vergangenheit (2004, based on Curse this House)
- Barbara Wood: Das Haus der Harmonie (2005, based on Perfect Harmony)
- Barbara Wood: Sturmjahre (2007, based on Domina)
- Barbara Wood: Karibisches Geheimnis (2009, based on Private Entrance)
