= Throne Labs =

American portable toilet company

- Throne Labs logo
- Type: Privately held company
- Industry: Sanitation
- Founded: 2020; 6 years ago Washington, D.C., US
- Founders: Fletcher Wilson; Jessica Heinzelman; Ben Clark
- Website: www.thronelabs.co

Throne Labs is a technology company that provides a "smart toilet" distributed network of portable toilets in the United States.

== History ==
The company was founded in June 2020 in Washington D.C. by Fletcher Wilson, who has experienced issues related to irritable bowel syndrome throughout his life and wanted to create a scalable public restroom solution for cities in the United States. The company's co-founders are Jessica Heinzelman and Ben Clark. As of 2021, United States ranks 30th globally in public bathrooms per capita, tied with Botswana with 8 public toilets per 100,000 citizens. Wilson now serves as the company's CEO.

== Funding ==
Throne Labs raised angel funding from Sandalphon Capital, Dipalo Ventures, Uncorrelated Ventures, and Ravin Gandhi.

In October 2025, Throne raised $15 million in a Series B round led by Brentwood Associates.

== Services ==
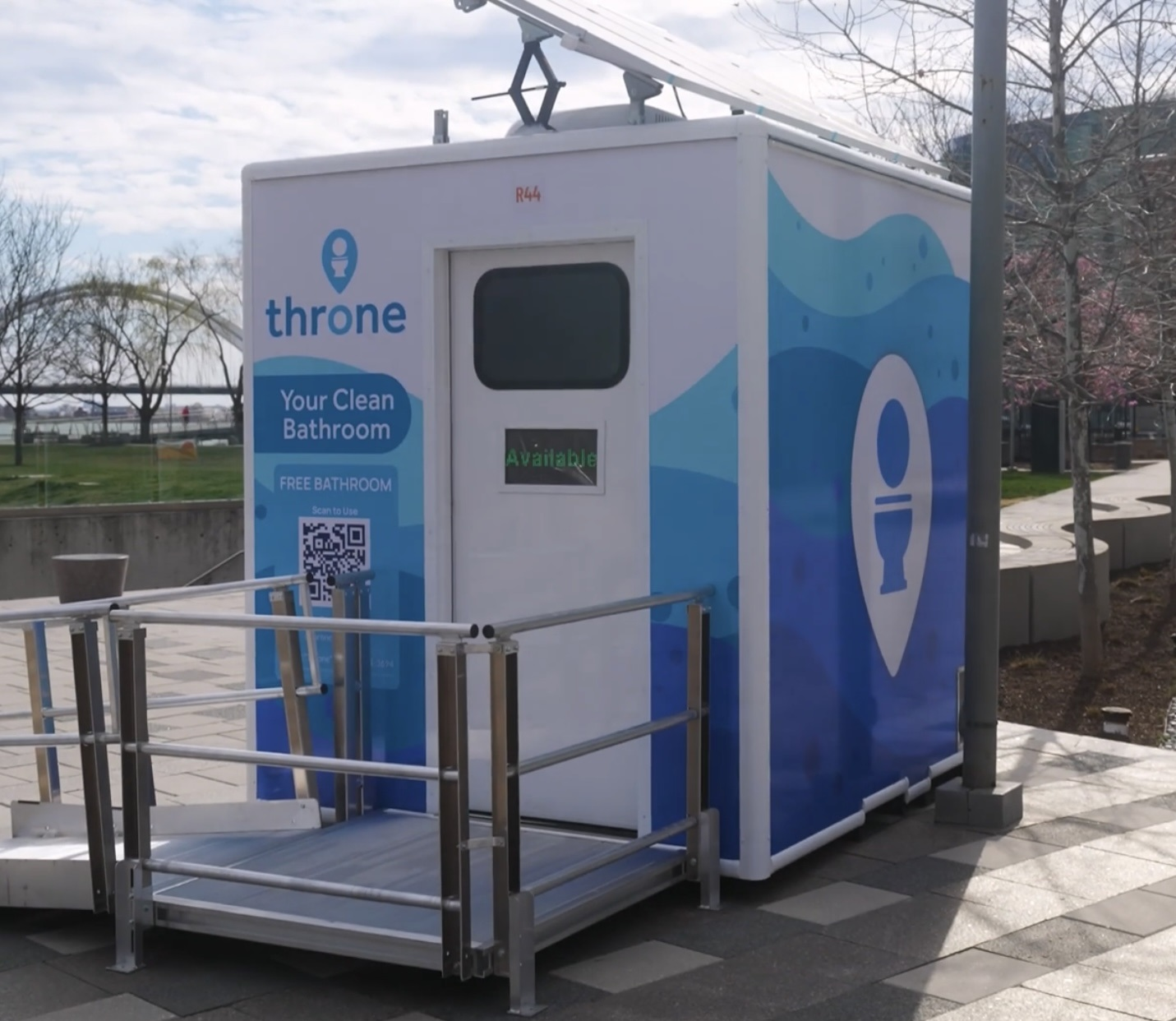
Throne Labs Unit

Throne Labs provides solar-powered portable toilets that feature a running water sink, flushing toilet, and ventilation. The units use sensor technology to monitor use and optimize the cleaning schedules. The company installs and services the units under contracts with municipalities and other public agencies.

Throne Lab units are free to use for consumers, who enter the units using a mobile app or QR code. As of 2026, the company operates units in New York City, Seattle, Atlanta, Washington D.C., Virginia, Los Angeles, Detroit, Long Beach, California, and Ann Arbor.

== Public response ==
Derek Delacourt, who oversees city operations and services for Ann Arbor, Michigan told the Wall Street Journal that the city tested 10 Thrones in a year-long program that included 100,000 uses, and ended up signing a five-year contract. "The experience for people has been almost nothing but positive. You rarely get that in public service anymore. The ratings of these bathrooms have been through the roof."

In Los Angeles, the region's Metro system has deployed 20 Throne bathrooms and has plans to add 44 more, in anticipation of the 2026 FIFA World Cup and 2028 Summer Olympics. One of the city's first deployments was at the Metro station in MacArthur Park, a densely populated area ravaged by the opioid epidemic. Stephen Tu, head of Station experience for Los Angeles Metro, told the Wall Street Journal, "A sort of community-policing mechanism took hold around the bathroom, as the unhoused people who relied on it for a clean and dignified place to deal with life's necessities took pains to make sure no one messed it up. We knew that if it could withstand some of the greatest societal challenges at that location, we were confident that we could expand this to other stations."

By June 2025, Throne public toilets in Washington, DC, had seen 63,000 users since they were installed, with Council member Brianne Nadeau saying, "People are begging us to expand." After a funding shortfall caused the temporary closure of 6 units, residents launched a Change.org petition, prompting DC Mayor Muriel Bowser to reverse the decision, saying "Fiscal Year 2025 funding for the Throne pilot program was frozen due to the congressional continuing resolution prohibiting the District from spending $1 billion of locally-raised revenues. We have identified funding to maintain the program."

In November 2025, the City of Long Beach, California extended its Throne Labs contract, which had 31,000 uses in the first 4 months. Todd Leland, the marine bureau manager for the City of Long Beach, said, "They clean based on the data. And so if you have a high volume use a restroom like we have here at the Belmont Pier, it's going to get more cleanings based on use. These Throne Lab smart restrooms, they give you a ten-minute limit that comes with an audible warning before opening the door to let the user out," Leland said.

In May 2026, Throne launched in Seattle, managed by King County Metro. Seattle Department of Transportation Deputy Director Liz Shelton said, "We're able to monitor the Throne, and if it's not working in a location, it can be moved pretty easily." Seattle Mayor Katie Wilson said, "I'm excited to see how these bathrooms work in real-world conditions, especially during our upcoming World Cup. And then see what else we can do to make public spaces more comfortable, functional, and welcoming for everyone."

In February 2026, New York City Mayor Zohran Mamdani announced a competitive process to find a public bathroom vendor. In June 2026, Throne Labs was awarded the exclusive contract across all five boroughs. New York City Department of Parks and Recreation Commissioner Tricia Shimamura said, "These innovative modular units by Throne Labs will ensure that clean, fully accessible restrooms are available everywhere, and we look forward to collaborating with our agency partners to identify the best sites along our park perimeters for these units." New York City Economic Development Corporation Interim President and CEO Jeanny Pak said. "Together with Throne, and our city government partners, we're expanding equitable access to public restrooms with practical, cost effective solutions that can be deployed citywide."

== Criticism ==
Privacy advocates have raised concerns about the collection of user data in Throne restrooms. Although the company states that personal information is anonymized and not shared with municipalities, critics argue that requiring digital identification for restroom access may reduce anonymity in public spaces.

Other observers have questioned whether Throne's technology-driven access model creates barriers for users without smartphones or digital literacy. The company has introduced alternatives such as text-message access and tap cards, but some concerns about equitable access have persisted.

Commentators have questioned whether recurring service fees for smart restroom deployments represent the most cost-effective approach compared with constructing and maintaining permanent public facilities, while supporters argue that the high costs and long timelines associated with traditional public restroom construction make Throne's model a practical alternative.
