= The Debate Society =

Theater company based in New York, NY

- The Debate Society's logo
- Formation: 2004
- Type: Theater company
- Purpose: Devised theater
- Location: Brooklyn, New York, US
- Members: Hannah Bos; Paul Thureen; Oliver Butler
- Website: thedebatesociety.org

The Debate Society is a Brooklyn, New York-based devised theater company founded by Hannah Bos, Paul Thureen, and Oliver Butler in 2004. The company's first show, A Thought About Raya, began as Bos and Thureen's senior thesis at Vassar College, where they met. Focusing on intensive research, the group has since added a variety of designers to its roster and has produced nine shows since its founding.

== History ==
Hannah Bos of Evanston, Illinois, and Paul Thureen who was raised near East Grand Forks, Minnesota, met at Vassar College and first performed in a play together during their sophomore year. The pair dated during college and ended their relationship in what Bos described as a "terrible breakup". They studied abroad together (at the National Theater Institute and in Russia) and cowrote their senior thesis, a play called A Thought About Raya before graduating in 2000.

The company's third member, Oliver Butler, "didn't go to Vassar, but [...] wish[ed] [he] did", according to Butler himself. While Butler, a University of Connecticut graduate, was involved at a battle of the bands at the college in 1998, he did not meet Bos and Thureen until 2003 when he attended a reading of A Thought About Raya at the Drama Book Shop in New York City. He approached Bos and Thureen immediately after the presentation and declared that he wanted to work with them, an idea about which the pair was initially hesitant. During a two-month trial period, Butler challenged Bos and Thureen's established group dynamic by requiring them to articulate to him their ideas which the pair ultimately found to be useful to their process. The company proper came into being in 2004 and is based in Brooklyn, New York City. They have worked with designers such as set designer Laura Jellinek, costume designer Sydney Maresca, lighting designer Mike Riggs, and sound designers Ben Truppin-Brown and M.L. Dogg.

== Process and style ==
The Debate Society is a devised theater company. Their name came as a product of their process which is research intensive; Bos described it as "a nerdy way of working". Bos, Butler, and Thureen begin the process of play-creation by fleshing out a world in which each story takes place. They then find some element of that world that excites them and attempt to theatricalize that element. Their theatermaking process includes acting exercises, listmaking, and intensive research.

Experimental theater director John Collins described the aesthetic of the company's works as having "filmic ambition". In The New York Times, Jason Zinoman wrote that The Debate Society's shows felt "uncannily familiar and teasingly mysterious at the same time."

== Works ==
- A Thought About Raya (Red Room, 2004)
- The Snow Hen (Charlie Pineapple Theater, 2006)
- The Eaten Heart (Ontological-Hysteric Theater, 2007)
- Cape Disappointment (Performance Space 122, 2008)
- You're Welcome: A Cycle of Bad Plays (The Brick Theater, 2010)
  - Includes We Got a Fog Machine, What a Scary Cemetery!, Is That Sharks in That Smoldering Moat?!, Little Cat Feet, and A Thought About Ryan.
- Buddy Cop 2 (Ontological-Hysteric Theater, 2010)
- Blood Play (Bushwick Starr, 2012)
- Jacuzzi (Ars Nova, 2014)
- The Light Years (Playwrights Horizons, 2017)
