= New York Public Library in popular culture =

The New York Public Library has been referenced numerous times in popular culture. Most of these depictions show the NYPL's flagship branch, an official national and city landmark.

== Architecture and sculpture ==
- A replica of the New York Public Library Main Branch is featured in Universal Studios Florida and Universal Studios Singapore.

== Film ==
- The Main Branch appears in such films as 42nd Street (1933), Portrait of Jennie (1948), Breakfast at Tiffany's (1961), You're a Big Boy Now (1966), A Boy Named Charlie Brown (1969), Beneath the Planet of the Apes (1970), Chapter Two (1979), Escape from New York (1981), The Muppets Take Manhattan (1984), Prizzi's Honor (1985), Regarding Henry (1991), Quiz Show (1994),The Thomas Crown Affair (1999), A.I. Artificial Intelligence (2001), The Time Machine (2002), and Sex and the City (2008).
- In The Wiz (1978), one of the stone lions adorning the front steps of the NYPL comes to life, and joins Dorothy and her dog, Toto, on their journey out of Oz.
- It is featured prominently in Ghostbusters (1984), when three of the main characters encounter the ghost of librarian Eleanor Twitty. Her origins and the library's prominence are explored in the video game sequel, Ghostbusters: The Video Game. In May 2010, the library invited comedy group Improv Everywhere to put on a brief performance in the main reading room based on Ghostbusters, as a promotional stunt. In the sequel Ghostbusters: Frozen Empire (2024), it revealed that the library had archived a cursed phonograph cylinder recorded by the gentlemen's club Manhattan Adventurers Society in 1904 that would have free the god Garraka from captivity, and the Ghostbusters are banned by the administrator Roger Delacorte (John Rothman) to enter the library.
- The Seward Park Branch appears in Party Girl (1995), starring Parker Posey, as the branch library where the protagonist Mary works as a clerk.
- It is a major setting in the apocalyptic science-fiction film The Day After Tomorrow (2004).
- A thinly disguised NYPL is the workplace of a librarian with access to many mythical objects imparting magical powers for fighting evil, in The Librarian TV-series and film franchise starring Noah Wyle. The first of the series is The Librarian: Quest for the Spear (2004).
- NYPL is featured in the film version of Sex and the City (2008) as the location of Carrie and Mr. Big's wedding.
- NYPL is featured in Oblivion (2013), starring Tom Cruise, shown as a rubble remnant of post-Apocalypse war.
- The NYPL system is the subject of the Frederick Wiseman documentary film Ex Libris – The New York Public Library.
- NYPL is featured near the beginning of the film John Wick: Chapter 3 - Parabellum (2019). There is a fight scene filmed in the library between John Wick (Keanu Reeves) and Ernest (Boban Marjanović).

== Literature ==
=== Books ===
- Lawrence Blochman's 1942 mystery, Death Walks in Marble Halls, features a murder committed using a brass spindle from a catalog drawer.
- In the 1984 murder mystery by Jane Smiley, Duplicate Keys, an NYPL librarian stumbles on two dead bodies, c. 1930.
- In the 1996 novel Contest by Matthew Reilly, the NYPL is the setting for an intergalactic gladiatorial fight.
- Cynthia Ozick's 2004 novel, Heir to the Glimmering World, set just prior to World War II, involves a refugee-scholar from Hitler's Germany researching the Karaite Jews at NYPL.
- Lynne Sharon Schwartz's The Writing on the Wall (2005) features a language researcher working at NYPL, who grapples with her past following the September 11, 2001, attacks.
- Linda Fairstein's Lethal Legacy (2009) is centered around the library.
- In Middlesex by Jeffrey Eugenides, the main character visits the NYPL to look up her condition in the dictionary.
- Allen Kurzweil's The Grand Complication is the story of an NYPL librarian whose research skills are used to find a missing museum object.
- Laura Ruby's The Chaos King centers around the library.
- Peng Shepherd's The Cartographers (2022) features a main character solving the mystery of a map found hidden in the Map Division of the library.

The library is referred to in:

- Henry Sydnor Harrison's V.V.'s Eyes (1913)
- P. G. Wodehouse's A Damsel in Distress (1919)
- Christopher Morley's short story, "Owd Bob," in his humor book Mince Pie (1919)
- James Baldwin's Go Tell It On the Mountain (1953)
- Bernard Malamud's short story "The German Refugee" (in his Complete Stories [1997]; originally published in The Saturday Evening Post in 1963)
- Stephen King's Firestarter (1980)
- Sarah Schulman's Girls, Visions and Everything (1986)
- Isaac Bashevis Singer's posthumous Shadows on the Hudson (1998)
- Akimi Yoshida's Banana Fish as one of the places the protagonist, Ash Lynx, enjoys visiting when he needs to be alone with his thoughts. In Garden of Light, it is stated that Eiji Okumura avoids the library due to events which occurred at the end of Banana Fish.
- In Fredric Brown's What Mad Universe the protagonist goes to the New York Public Library (rather, to its analogue in an alternate history timeline) in an effort to make sense of the strange world in which he found himself.
- Adam Lee's dystopian "The Commonwealth", featuring "The Last Stand of the Librarians" ().
- False Values by Ben Aaronovitch, the eighth book in the Rivers of London series reveals NYPL to be a major force in the North American magical hierarchy.

Additionally, excerpts from several of the many memoirs and essays mentioning the New York Public Library are included in the anthology Reading Rooms (1991), including reminiscences by Alfred Kazin, Henry Miller, and Kate Simon.

=== Poetry ===
Both branches and the central building have been immortalized in numerous poems, including:

- Paul Blackburn's "Graffiti" (in The Collected Poems of Paul Blackburn [1985])
- Richard Eberhart's "Reading Room, The New York Public Library" (in his Collected Poems, 1930–1986 [1988])
- Lawrence Ferlinghetti's "Library Scene, Manhattan" (in his How to Paint Sunlight [2001])
- Arthur Guiterman's "The Book Line; Rivington Street Branch, New York Public Library" (in his Ballads of Old New York [1920])
- Muriel Rukeyser's "Nuns in the Wind" (in The Collected Poems of Muriel Rukeyser [2005])
- Susan Thomas' "New York Public Library" (the anthology American Diaspora [2001])
- E.B. White's "Reading Room" (Poems and Sketches of E.B. White [1981])
- Aaron Zeitlin's poem about going to the library, included in his 2-volume Ale lider un poemes [Complete Lyrics and Poems] (1967 and 1970)

== Music ==
- NYPL is featured in the 1972 Alice Cooper rock/pop video for Elected (1972).

== Television ==
- The library is the inspiration for the Busterfield Library in Between the Lions.
- It is the setting for much of "The Persistence of Memory", the eleventh part of Carl Sagan's Cosmos TV series.
- The animated television series Futurama has Fry confronting a giant brain at the NYPL in the episode "The Day the Earth Stood Stupid".
- In the Seinfeld episode "The Library", Cosmo Kramer (Michael Richards) dates an NYPL librarian, Jerry Seinfeld is accosted by a library cop (Philip Baker Hall) for late fees, and George Costanza (Jason Alexander) encounters his high school gym teacher living homeless on its steps.
- It was shown in the pilot episode of the ABC series Traveler as the Drexler Museum of Art.
- In the second episode of Girl Meets World ("Girl Meets Boy"), Cory gives to the class an assignment to do in the New York Public Library.
- The penultimate and final episodes of Season 2 of Person of Interest feature scenes which take place in New York Public Library, and is the location of the Machine's godmode phonecall after it was crashed by a virus.
- In the Season One episode of The Newsroom "The Blackout Part I: Tragedy Porn", Charlie Skinner meets an anonymous NSA whistleblower in the NYPL to discuss the NSA's surveillance programs.
- In the fifth-season finale episode of Once Upon a Time "An Untold Story", Henry asks Emma, Regina, Rumple, and Violet to make a wish and throw a penny in the fountain outside the library in hopes of restoring magic to get his family home. After seeing that it works, Henry stands on a pedestal by one of the lion statues outside the library and asks others to believe in magic again and throw pennies in the fountain. People soon do it and Emma and Regina soon see that what Henry is doing is actually restoring magic, allowing his family to come home through in a portal in the fountain made by everyone's wishes. When everyone sees what is happening, Henry is sad due to the people believing it was a magic trick, but Emma soon tells him that he made the city to actually believe in magic.
