= New York Public Library =

Public library system in New York City

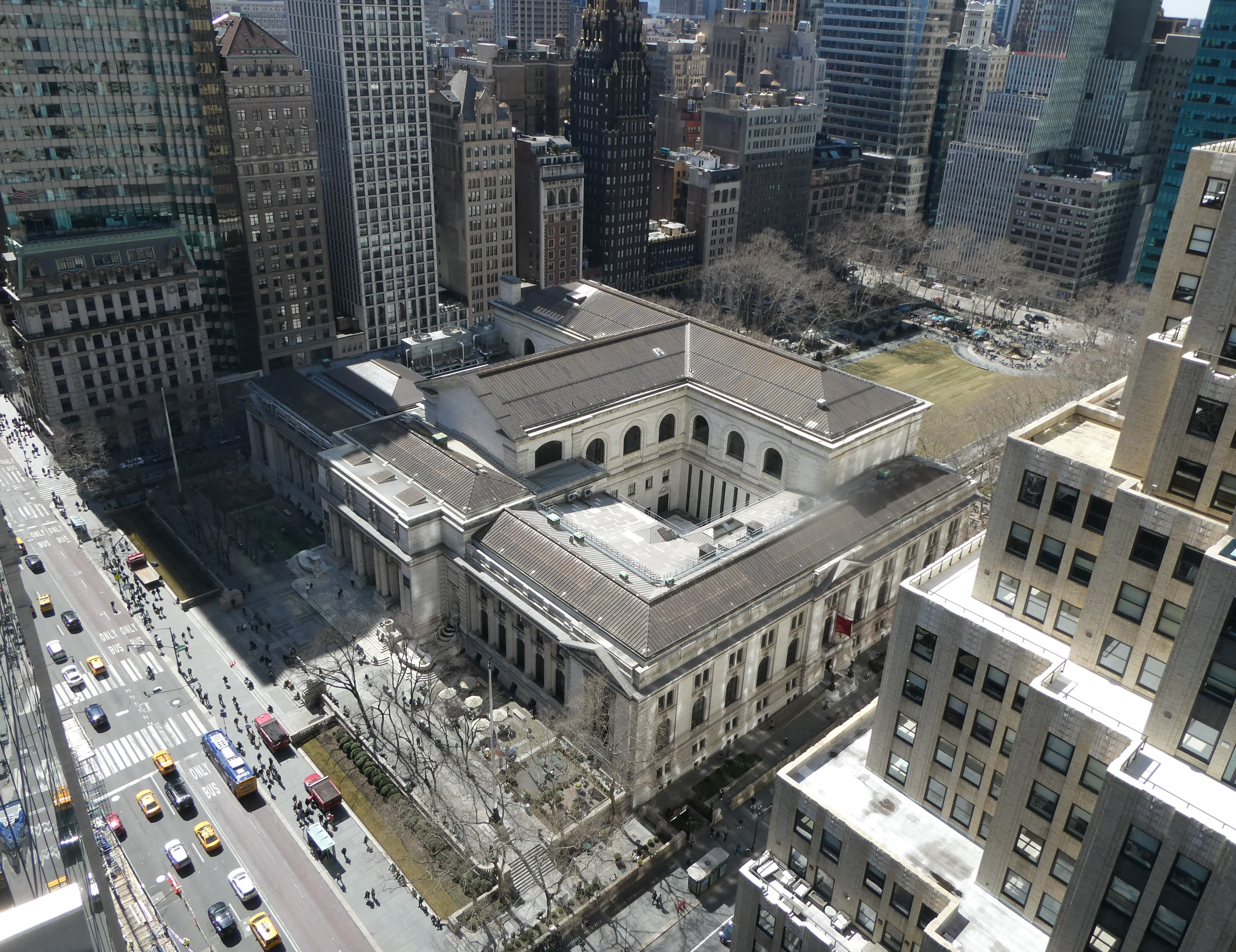
- The New York Public Library Main Branch in Manhattan
- 40°45′11″N 73°58′55″W
- Location: 476 Fifth Avenue, New York City, U.S.
- Established: May 23, 1895; 131 years ago
- Branches: 92

Collection
- Size: 55 million

Access and use
- Population served: 3.5 million (the Bronx, Manhattan, and Staten Island)

Other information
- Budget: US$302,208,000 (2017); Endowment: $1,448,838,000
- Director: Anthony Marx, president and CEO; Brent Reidy, Andrew W. Mellon Director of the Research Libraries
- Employees: 3,150
- Website: nypl.org

The New York Public Library (NYPL) is a chartered public library system in New York City, United States. With nearly 53 million items and 92 locations, the New York Public Library is the second-largest library in the United States, behind the Library of Congress, and sixth-largest in the world. It is a private, non-governmental, independently managed, nonprofit corporation operating with both private and public financing.

The library has branches in the boroughs of the Bronx, Manhattan, and Staten Island and affiliations with academic and professional libraries in the New York metropolitan area. The city's other two boroughs, Brooklyn and Queens, are not served by the New York Public Library system, but rather by their respective borough library systems: the Brooklyn Public Library and the Queens Public Library. The branch libraries are open to the general public and consist of circulating libraries. The New York Public Library also has four research libraries, which are also open to the general public.

The library, officially chartered as The New York Public Library, Astor, Lenox and Tilden Foundations, was developed in the 19th century, founded from an amalgamation of grass-roots libraries and social libraries of bibliophiles and the wealthy, aided by the philanthropy of the wealthiest Americans of their age.

The "New York Public Library" name may also refer to its Main Branch, which is easily recognizable by its lion statues named Patience and Fortitude that sit either side of the entrance. The branch was declared a National Historic Landmark in 1965, listed on the National Register of Historic Places in 1966, and designated a New York City Landmark in 1967.

== History ==
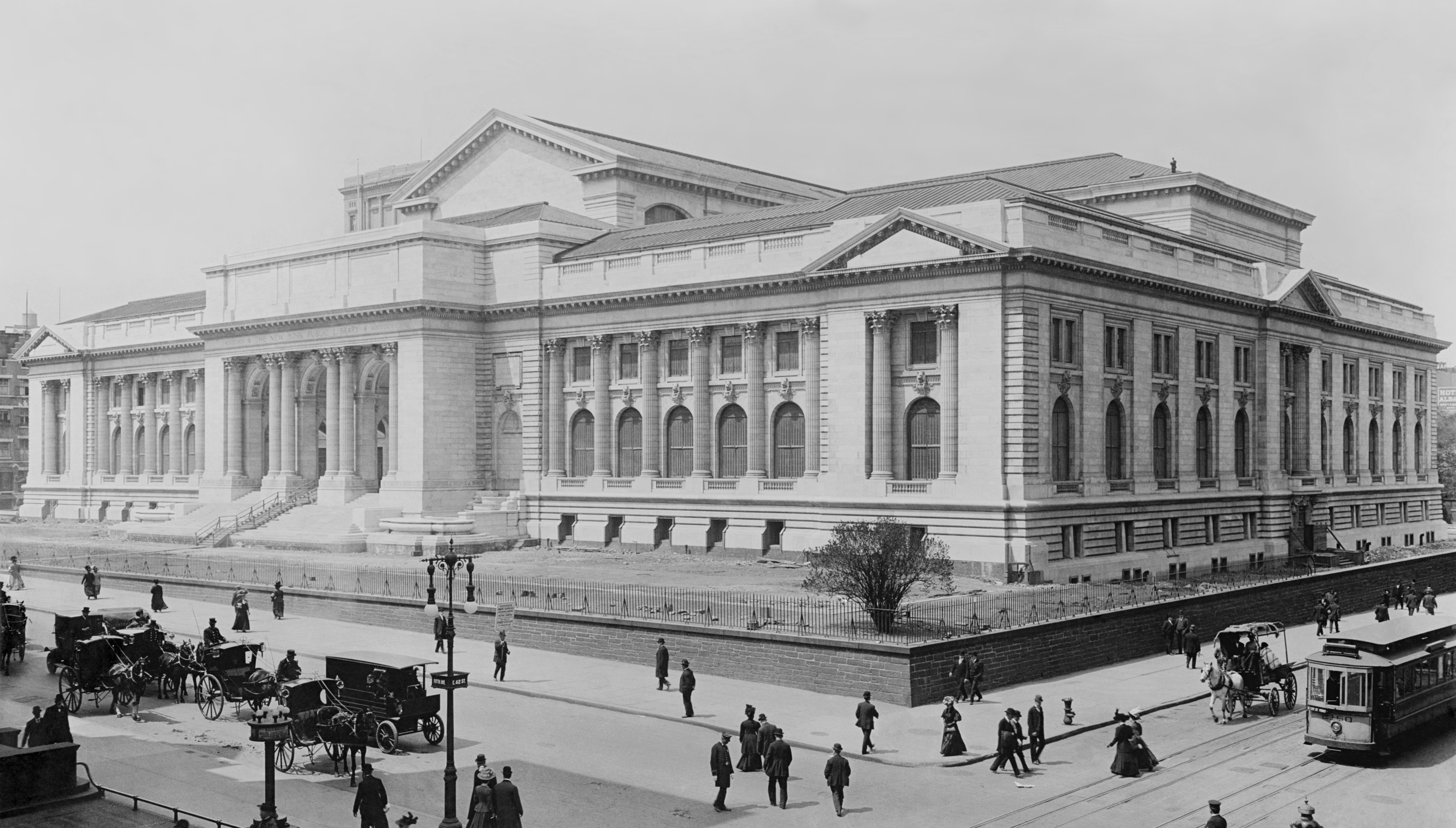
The New York Public Library Main Branch during its late stage construction in 1908 with the lion statues not yet installed at the entrance

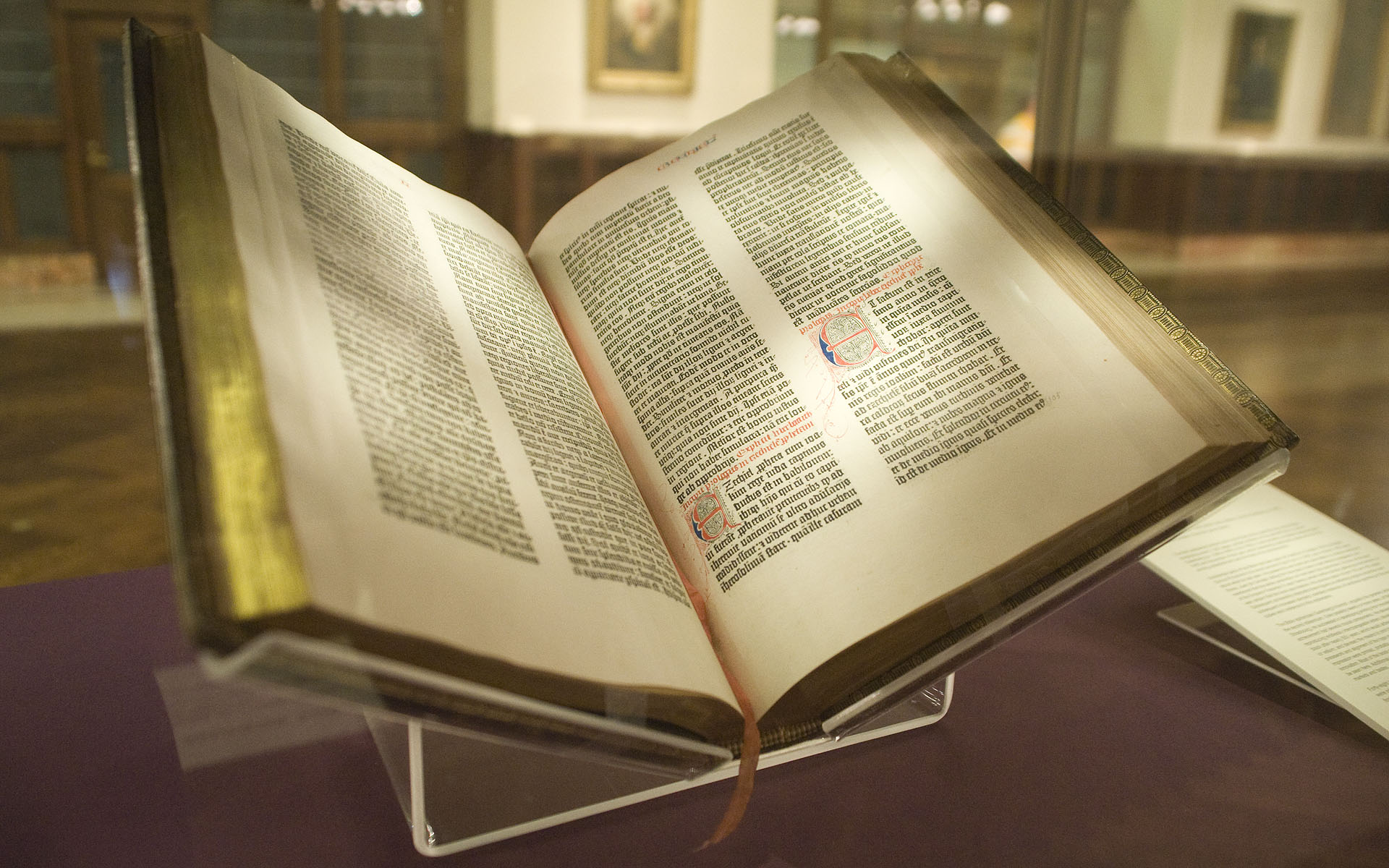
Lenox copy of the Gutenberg Bible in the New York Public Library

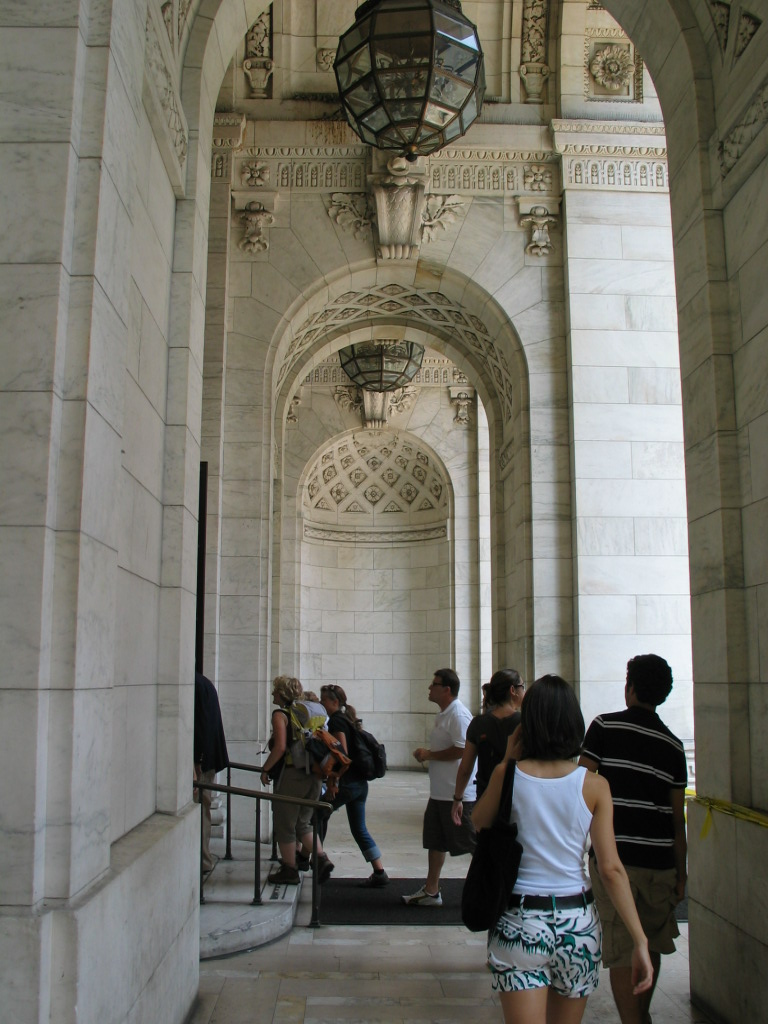
Cross-view of classical details in the Main Branch's entrance portico

At the behest of Joseph Cogswell, John Jacob Astor added a codicil to his will to bequeath $400,000 (equivalent of $14.9 million in 2025) for the creation of a public library. After Astor's death in 1848, the resulting board of trustees executed the will's conditions and constructed the Astor Library in 1854 in the East Village.

The library created was a free reference library; its books were not permitted to circulate. By 1872, the Astor Library was described in a New York Times editorial as a "major reference and research resource", but, "Popular it certainly is not, and, so greatly is it lacking in the essentials of a public library, that its stores might almost as well be under lock and key, for any access the masses of the people can get thereto".

An act of the New York State Legislature incorporated the Lenox Library in 1870. The library was built on Fifth Avenue, between 70th and 71st Streets, in 1877. Bibliophile and philanthropist James Lenox donated a vast collection of his Americana, art works, manuscripts, and rare books, including the first Gutenberg Bible in the New World. At its inception, the library charged admission and did not permit physical access to any literary items.

Former Governor of New York and presidential candidate Samuel J. Tilden believed that a library with citywide reach was required, and upon his death in 1886, he bequeathed the bulk of his fortune—about $2.4 million (equivalent of $86 million in 2025)—to "establish and maintain a free library and reading room in the city of New York". This money would sit untouched in a trust for several years, until John Bigelow, a New York attorney, and Andrew Haswell Green, both trustees of the Tilden fortune, came up with an idea to merge two of the city's largest libraries.

Both the Astor and Lenox libraries were struggling financially. Although New York City already had numerous libraries in the 19th century, almost all of them were privately funded and many charged admission or usage fees (a notable exception was Cooper Union, which opened its free reading room to the public in 1859). Bigelow, the most prominent supporter of the plan to merge the two libraries found support in Lewis Cass Ledyard, a member of the Tilden Board, as well as John Cadwalader, on the Astor board. Eventually, John Stewart Kennedy, president of the Lenox board, also came to support the plan.

On May 23, 1895, Bigelow, Cadwalader, and George L. Rives agreed to create "The New York Public Library, Astor, Lenox and Tilden Foundations". The plan was hailed as an example of private philanthropy for the public good. On December 11, John Shaw Billings was named as the library's first director. The newly established library consolidated with the grass-roots New York Free Circulating Library in February 1901.

In March, Andrew Carnegie tentatively agreed to donate $5.2 million (equivalent of $201 million in 2025) to construct sixty-five branch libraries in the city, with the requirement that they be operated and maintained by the City of New York. The Brooklyn and Queens public library systems, which predated the consolidation of New York City, eschewed the grants offered to them and did not join the NYPL system; they believed that they would not get treatment equal to the Manhattan and the Bronx counterparts.

Later, in 1901, Carnegie formally signed a contract with the City of New York to transfer his donation to the city in order to enable it to justify purchasing the land for building the branch libraries. The NYPL Board of trustees hired consultants for the planning, and accepted their recommendation that a limited number of architectural firms be hired to build the Carnegie libraries; this would ensure uniformity of appearance and minimize cost. The trustees hired McKim, Mead & White, Carrère and Hastings, and Walter Cook to design all the branch libraries.

New York author Washington Irving was a close friend of Astor's for decades and had helped the philanthropist design the Astor Library. Irving served as President of the library's Board of Trustees from 1848 until his death in 1859, shaping the library's collecting policies with his strong sensibility regarding European intellectual life. Subsequently, the library hired nationally prominent experts to guide its collections policies; they reported directly to directors John Shaw Billings (who also developed the National Library of Medicine), Edwin H. Anderson, Harry M. Lydenberg, Franklin F. Hopper, Ralph A. Beals, and Edward Freehafer (1954–1970). They emphasized expertise, objectivity, and a very broad worldwide range of knowledge in acquiring, preserving, organizing, and making available to the general population nearly 12 million books and 26.5 million additional items. The directors in turn reported to an elite board of trustees, chiefly elderly, well-educated, philanthropic, predominantly Protestant, upper-class white men with commanding positions in American society. They saw their role as protecting the library's autonomy from politicians as well as bestowing upon it status, resources, and prudent care.

In 1920, Catherine Allen Latimer became the system's first African-American librarian.

Representative of many major board decisions was the purchase in 1931 of the private library of Grand Duke Vladimir Alexandrovich (1847–1909), uncle of the last tsar. This was one of the largest acquisitions of Russian books and photographic materials; at the time, the Soviet government had a policy of selling its cultural collections abroad for gold. Related collections include a significant number of important works by Russian photographers, and photographs related to the House of Romanov and Russia expert George Kennan.

The military drew extensively from the library's map and book collections in the world wars, including hiring its staff. For example, the Map Division's chief Walter Ristow was appointed as head of the geography section of the War Department's New York Office of Military Intelligence from 1942 to 1945. Ristow and his staff discovered, copied, and loaned thousands of strategic, rare or unique maps to war agencies in need of information not available through other sources.

=== Research libraries ===
==== Main branch building ====
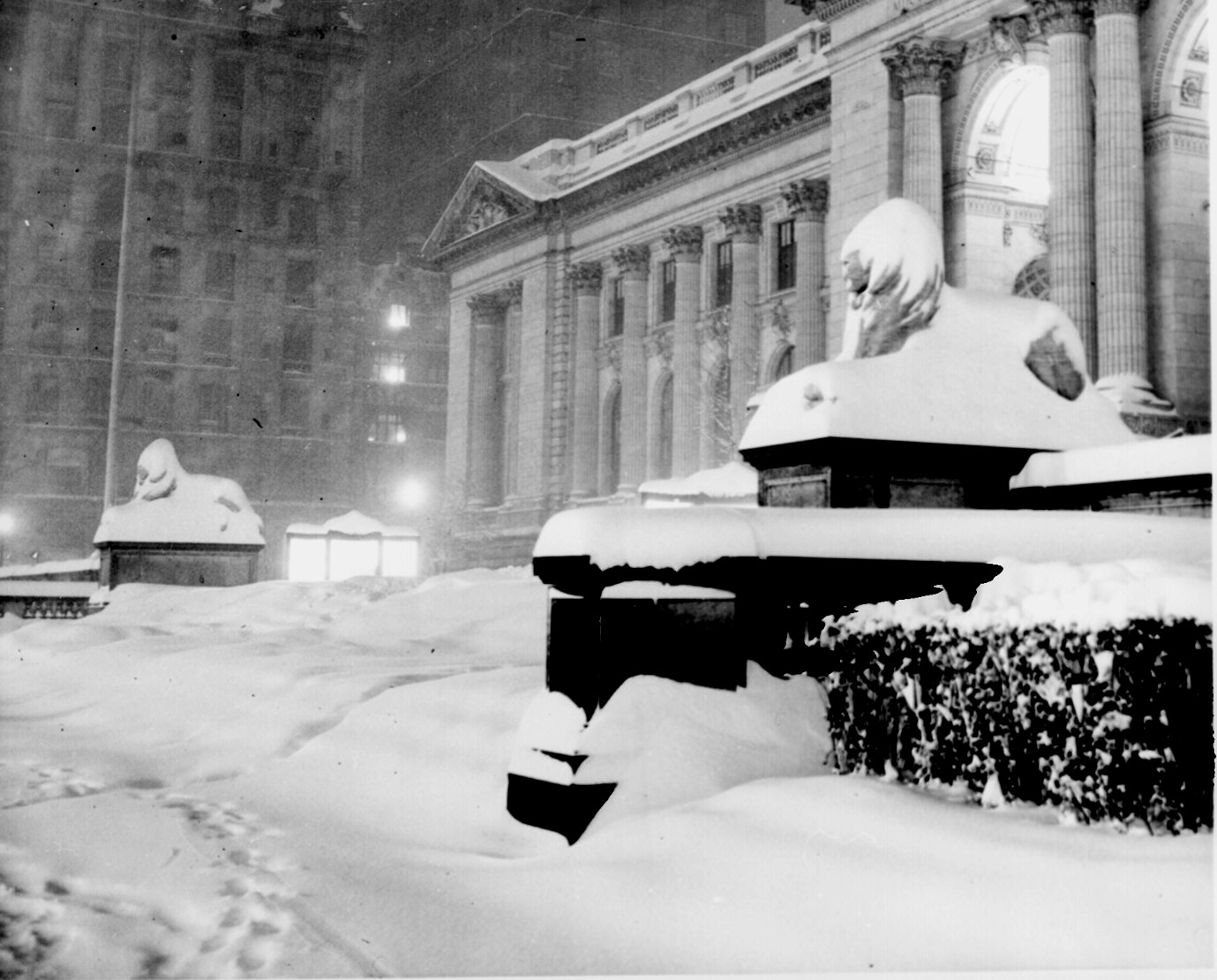
Patience and Fortitude, the "Library Lion" statues, in a December 1948 snowstorm

The organizers of the New York Public Library, wanting an imposing main branch, chose a central site along Fifth Avenue between 40th and 42nd Streets, on top of the Croton Reservoir. John Shaw Billings, the first director of the library, created an initial design that became the basis of the new building containing a huge reading room on top of seven floors of book stacks, combined with a system that was designed to get books into the hands of library users as fast as possible. The architectural firm Carrère and Hastings constructed the structure in the Beaux-Arts style, and the structure opened on May 23, 1911. It was the largest marble structure up to that time in the United States.

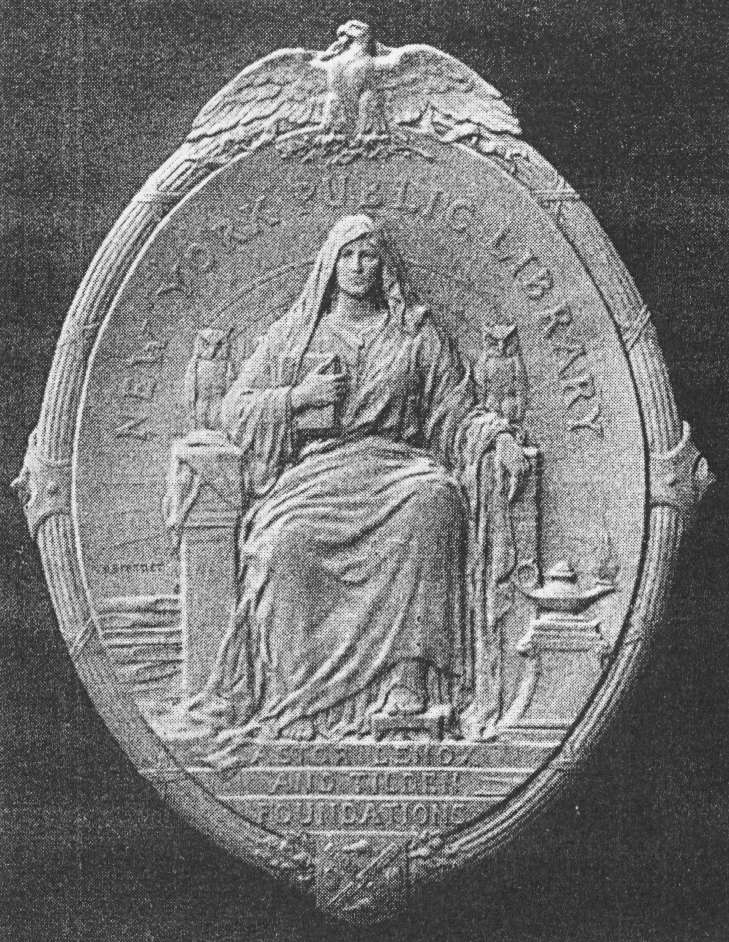
The Library's historical seal, designed by sculptor Victor David Brenner in 1909, best known for designing the Lincoln cent. Though rarely used, the seated personification of wisdom appears on plaques at several branches.

The two stone lions guarding the entrance were sculpted by E.C. Potter and carved by the Piccirilli Brothers. Its main reading room was contemporaneously the largest of its kind in the world at 77 ft (23 m) wide by 295 ft (90 m) long, with 50-foot-high (15 m) ceilings.

An expansion in the 1970s and 1980s added storage space under Bryant Park, directly west of the library. The structure was given a major restoration from 2007 to 2011, underwritten by a $100 million gift from philanthropist Stephen A. Schwarzman, for whom the branch was subsequently renamed. Today, the branch's main reading room is equipped with computers with access to library collections and the Internet as well as docking facilities for laptops. A Fellows program makes reserved rooms available for writers and scholars, selected annually, and many have accomplished important research and writing at the library.

The Main Branch also contains several historic designations. It was declared a National Historic Landmark in 1965, listed on the National Register of Historic Places in 1966, and designated a New York City designated landmark in 1967. Astor Hall, first-to-third-floor stairs, and McGraw Rotunda were designated as interior landmarks in 1974. and the Rose Main Reading Room and Public Catalog Room were separately made New York City designated landmarks in 2017.

==== Other research branches ====
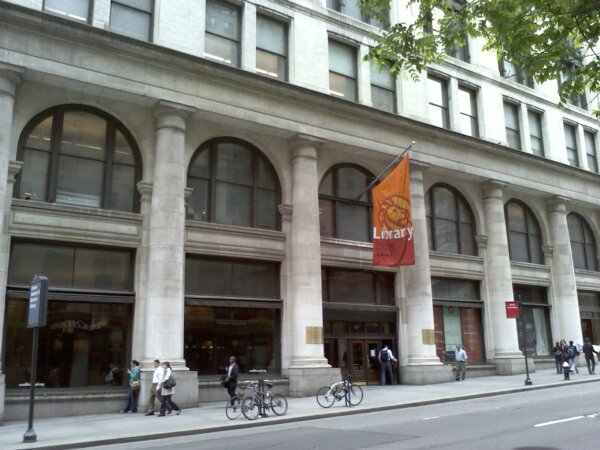
The Science, Industry and Business Library

In the 1990s, the New York Public Library decided to relocate that portion of the research collection devoted to science, technology, and business to a new location. The library purchased and adapted the former B. Altman & Company Building on 34th Street. In 1995, the 100th anniversary of the founding of the library, the $100 million Science, Industry and Business Library (SIBL), designed by Gwathmey Siegel & Associates of Manhattan, opened to the public. Upon the creation of the SIBL, the central research library on 42nd Street was renamed the Humanities and Social Sciences Library.

With the closure of the Science, Industry and Business Library following the reopening of the midtown Manhattan library, there are three open research libraries that comprise the NYPL's research library system; together they hold approximately 44 million items. Total item holdings, including the collections of the Branch Libraries, are 50.6 million. The Humanities and Social Sciences Library on 42nd Street is still the heart of the NYPL's research library system. The NYPL's two other research libraries are the Schomburg Center for Research and Black Culture, located at 135th Street and Lenox Avenue in Harlem, and the New York Public Library for the Performing Arts, located at Lincoln Center. In addition to their reference collections, the Library for the Performing Arts has circulating components that are administered as ordinary branch libraries.

=== Recent history ===
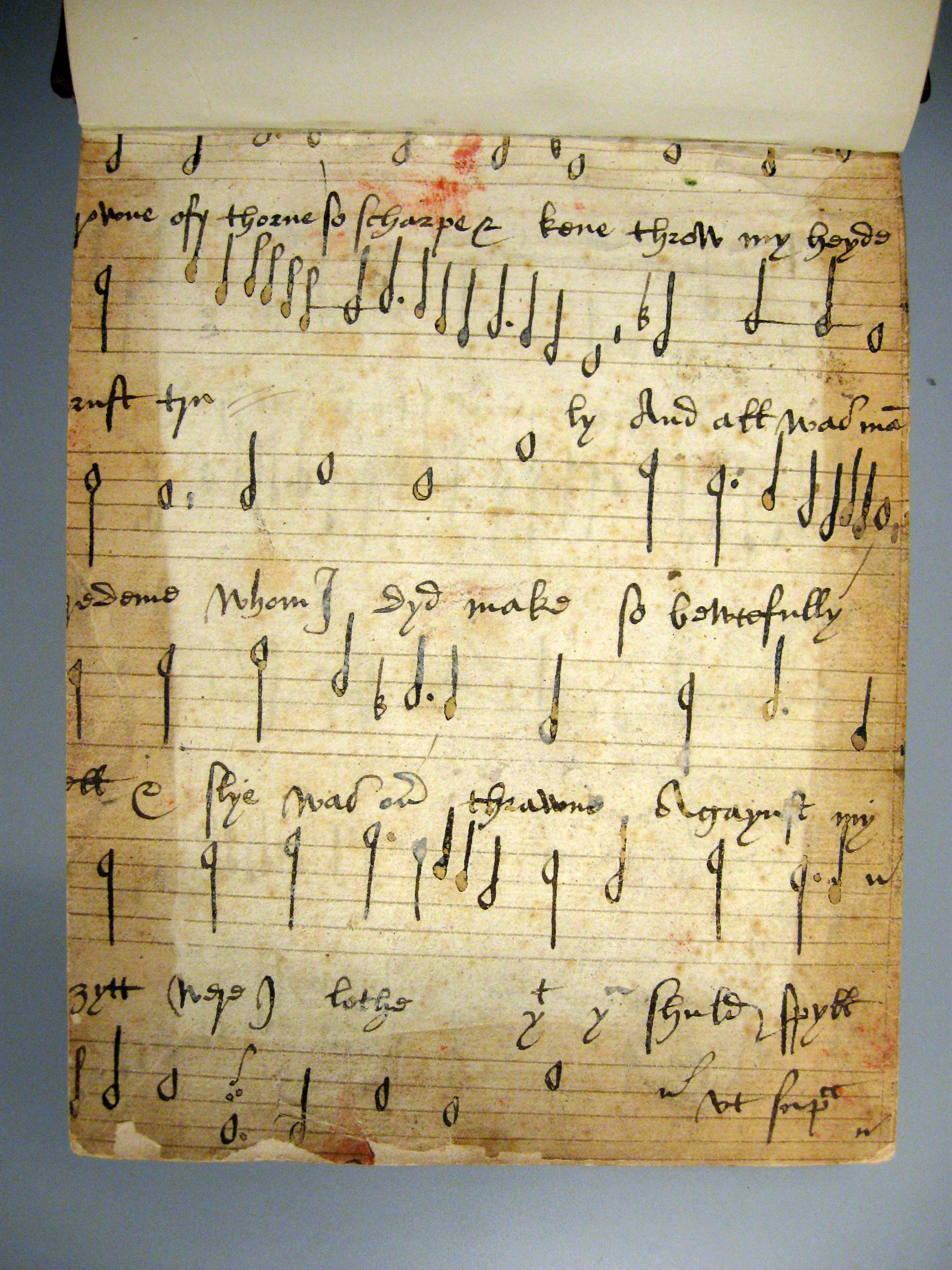
Recto of a 16th-century music manuscript found in the front pastedown of Drexel 4180, a manuscript in the Music Division of the New York Public Library

The New York Public Library was not created by government statute. From its earliest days, the library was formed from a partnership of city government with private philanthropy. As of 2010, the research libraries in the system are largely funded with private money, and the branch or circulating libraries are financed primarily with city government funds. Until 2009, the research and branch libraries operated almost entirely as separate systems, but that year various operations were merged. By early 2010, the NYPL staff had been reduced by about 16 percent, in part through the consolidations.

In 2010, as part of the consolidation program, the NYPL moved various back-office operations to a new Library Services Center building in Long Island City. A former warehouse was renovated for this purpose for $50 million. In the basement, a new, $2.3 million book sorter uses bar codes on library items to sort them for delivery to 132 branch libraries. At two-thirds the length of a football field, the machine is the largest of its kind in the world, according to library officials. Books located in one branch and requested from another go through the sorter, the use of which has cut waiting times by at least a day. Together with 14 library employees, the machine can sort 7,500 items an hour (or 125 a minute). On the first floor of the Library Services Center is an ordering and cataloging office; on the second, the digital imaging department (formerly at the Main Branch building) and the manuscripts and archives division, where the air is kept cooler; on the third, the Barbara Goldsmith Preservation Division, with a staff of 10 (as of 2010) but designed for as many as 30 employees.

The NYPL maintains a force of NYC special patrolmen, who provide security and protection to various libraries, and NYPL special investigators, who oversee security operations at the library facilities. These officials have on-duty arrest authority granted by the New York Penal Law. Some library branches contract for security guards.

In 2014 NYPL launched a project called "Library Simplified", to address the difficulties that patrons were having checking out e-books, especially compared to the process for buying them. By 2016 the project had produced an app called "SimplyE", which the library launched that year; patrons could explore and check-out ebooks from multiple vendors, with just a few clicks. The library released the code for SimplyE open source.

To celebrate its 125th anniversary in 2020, the NYPL calculated a list of its most checked out books. Topping the list was Ezra Jack Keats' The Snowy Day, with The Cat in the Hat and Nineteen Eighty-Four rounding out the top three.

Until 2021, the NYPL charged a late fee of $0.25 per day per book; other types of items had different late fees, and seniors and disabled patrons paid lower late fees. The library system's president, Anthony Marx, indicated his intention to eliminate late fees after assuming the library's presidency in 2011. The NYPL stopped charging late fees on October 5, 2021. Existing debts have since been cleared from the records of all NYPL patrons.

On November 26, 2023, Sunday services were discontinued at select branches where it was offered; along with reduced programs for adults and children. This followed months of contentious budget negotiations between the City Council and Mayor Eric Adams, with Adams claiming that the New York City migrant housing crisis necessitated the budget cuts. The $12.6 million in city spending for the NYPL represents 0.02% of the city's 2024 budget of $110 billion. Funding for Sunday service was restored in June 2024.

=== BookOps ===
In February 2013, the New York and Brooklyn public libraries announced that they would merge their technical services departments. The new department is called BookOps. The proposed merger anticipates a savings of $2 million for the Brooklyn Public Library and $1.5 million for the New York Public Library. Although not currently part of the merger, it is expected that the Queens Public Library will eventually share some resources with the other city libraries. As of 2011, circulation in the New York Public Library systems and Brooklyn Public Library systems has increased by 59%. Located in Long Island City, BookOps was created as a way to save money while improving patrons service. The services of BookOps include the Selection Team which "acquires, describes, prepares, and delivers new items for the circulating collections of Brooklyn Public Library (BPL) and New York Public Library, and for the general collections of NYPL's research libraries." Under the Selection Team are the Acquisitions Department, the Cataloging Department, The Collections Processing Unit, and the Logistics Department.

Before this facility opened, all the aforementioned departments were housed in different locations with no accountability between them, and items sometimes taking up to two weeks to reach their intended destination. BookOps now has all departments in one building and in 2015 sorted almost eight million items. The building has numerous rooms, including a room dedicated to caring for damaged books.

=== Controversies ===
The consolidations and changes in collections have promoted continuing debate and controversy since 2004 when David Ferriero was named the Andrew W. Mellon Director and Chief Executive of the Research Libraries. NYPL had engaged consultants Booz Allen Hamilton to survey the institution, and Ferriero endorsed the survey's report as a big step "in the process of reinventing the library". The consolidation program has resulted in the elimination of subjects such as the Asian and Middle East Division (formerly named Oriental Division), as well as the Slavic and Baltic Division.

A number of innovations in recent years have been criticized. In 2004 NYPL announced participation in the Google Books Library Project. By agreement between Google and major international libraries, selected collections of public domain books would be scanned in their entirety and made available online for free to the public. The negotiations between the two partners called for each to project guesses about ways that libraries are likely to expand in the future. According to the terms of the agreement, the data cannot be crawled or harvested by any other search engine; no downloading or redistribution is allowed. The partners and a wider community of research libraries can share the content.

The sale of the separately endowed former Donnell Library in midtown provoked controversy. The elimination of Donnell was a result of the dissolution of children's, young adult and foreign language collections. The Donnell Media Center was also dismantled, the bulk of its collection relocated at the New York Public Library for the Performing Arts as the Reserve Film and Video Collection, with parts of its collection redistributed. The site was redeveloped for a luxury hotel.

Several veteran librarians have retired, and the number of age-level specialists in the boroughs have been cut back.

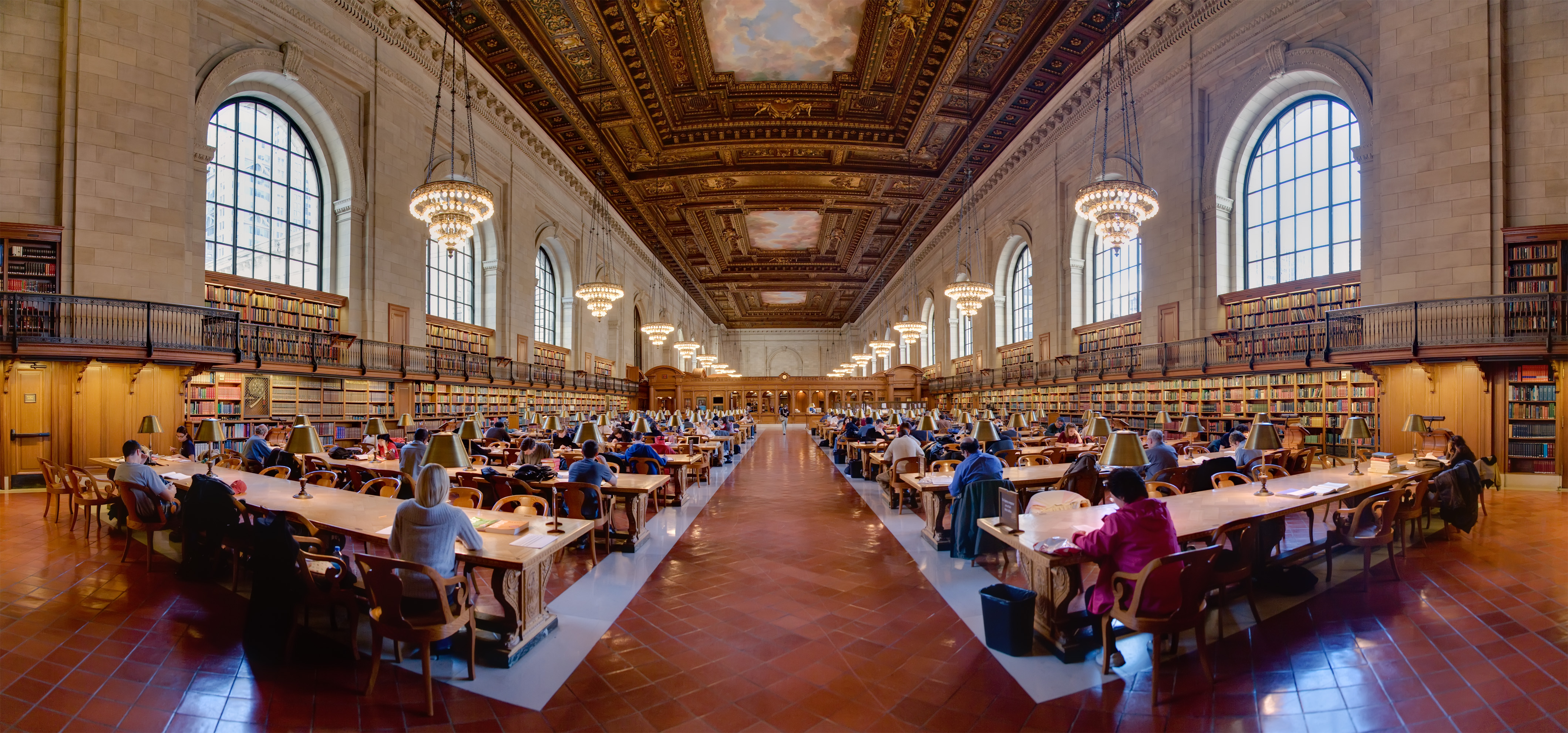
Rose Main Reading Room

== Branch libraries ==
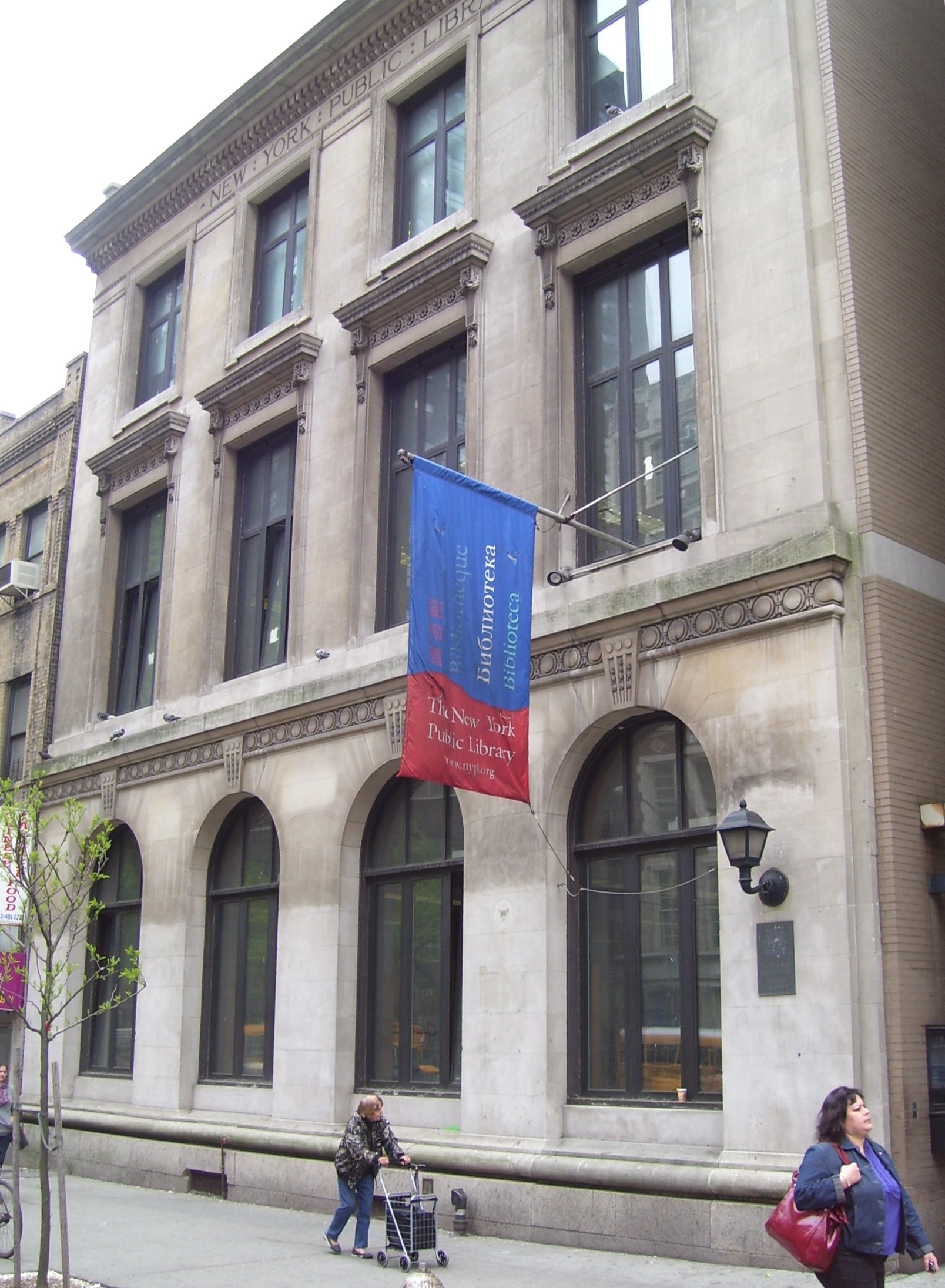
The Epiphany Branch on East 23rd Street in Manhattan

The New York Public Library system maintains commitment as a public lending library through its branch libraries in the Bronx, Manhattan, and Staten Island, including the Stavros Niarchos Foundation Library (formerly: Mid-Manhattan Library), the Andrew Heiskell Braille and Talking Book Library, the circulating collections of the Science, Industry and Business Library, and the circulating collections of the New York Public Library for the Performing Arts. The branch libraries comprise the third-largest library in the United States. These circulating libraries offer a wide range of collections, programs, and services, including the renowned Picture Collection at Stavros Niarchos Foundation Library and the Media Center, redistributed from Donnell.

The system has 40 libraries in Manhattan, 35 in the Bronx, and 14 in Staten Island. The newest is the Charleston Library, which opened on March 16, 2022. As of 2022, the New York Public Library consisted of 4 research centers and 89 neighborhood branch libraries in the three boroughs served. All libraries in the NYPL system may be used free of charge by all visitors.

As of 2026, the NYPL collections contain more than 56 million items (books, videotapes, maps, etc.), a number surpassed only by the Library of Congress and the British Library.

== Services ==
=== ASK NYPL ===
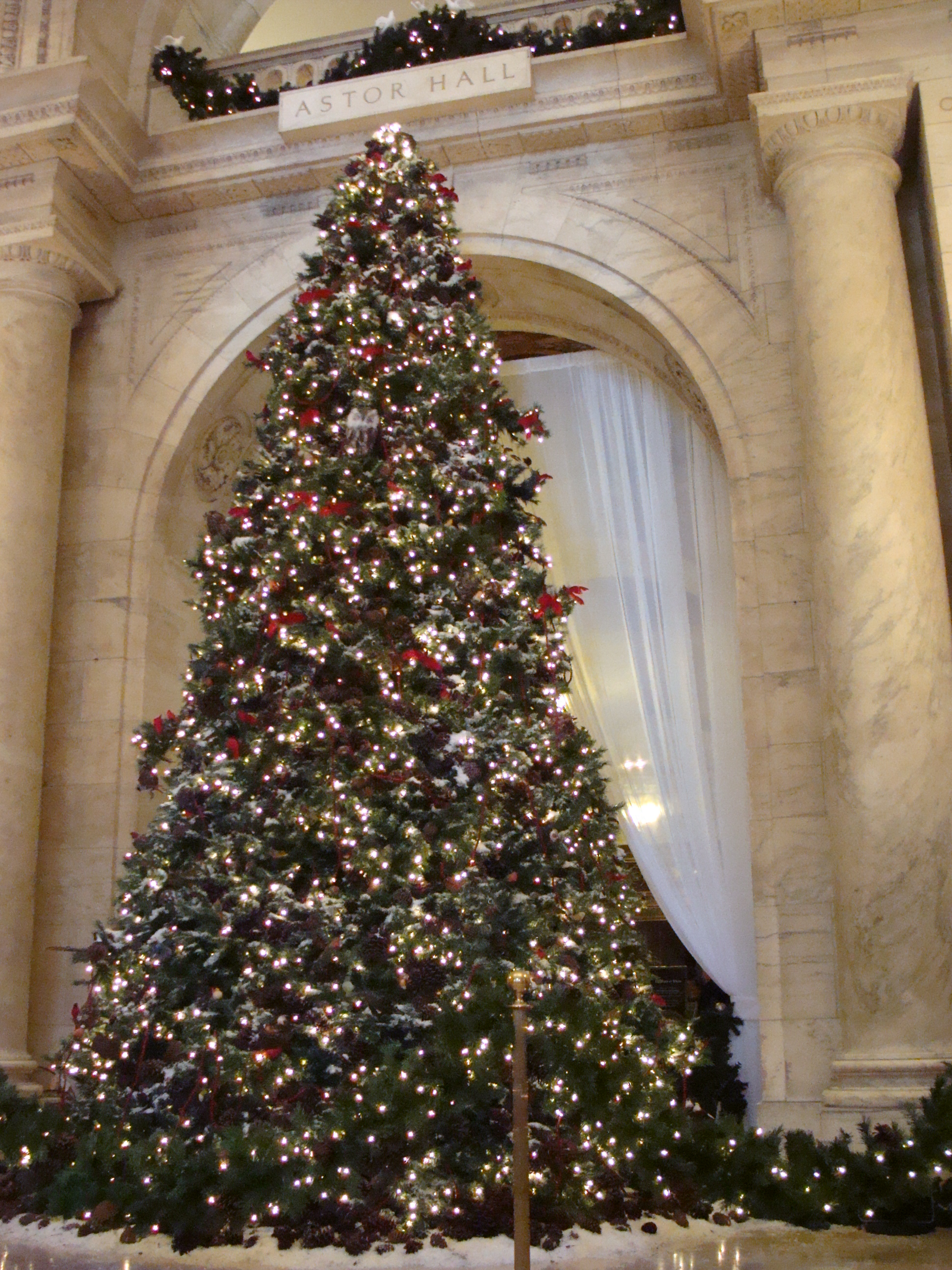
A Christmas tree at Astor Hall adjacent to the main entrance to the NYPL's main branch

Telephone Reference, known as ASK NYPL, answers 100,000 questions per year, by phone and online, as well as in The New York Times.

=== Website and digital holdings ===
The Library website provides access to the library's catalogs, online collections and subscription databases. It also has information about the library's free events, exhibitions, computer classes and English as a Second Language (ESL) classes. The two online catalogs, LEO (which searches the circulating collections) and CATNYP (which searches the research collections) allow users to search the library's holdings of books, journals and other materials. The LEO system allows cardholders to request books from any branch and have them delivered to any branch.

The NYPL gives cardholders free access from home to thousands of current and historical magazines, newspapers, journals and reference books in subscription databases, including EBSCOhost, which contains full text of major magazines; full text of the New York Times (1995–present), Gale's Ready Reference Shelf which includes the Encyclopedia of Associations and periodical indexes, Books in Print; and Ulrich's Periodicals Directory. The New York Public Library also links to outside resources, such as the Bureau of Labor Statistics' Occupational Outlook Handbook, and the CIA's World Factbook. Databases are available for children, teenagers, and adults of all ages.

The NYPL Digital Collections (formerly named Digital Gallery) is a database of over 900,000 images digitized from the library's collections. The Digital Collections was named one of Time Magazine's 50 Coolest Websites of 2005 and Best Research Site of 2006 by an international panel of museum professionals.

The Photographers' Identities Catalog (PIC) is an experimental online service of the Photography Collection in the Stephen A. Schwarzman Building. Other databases available only from within the library include Nature, IEEE and Wiley science journals, Wall Street Journal archives, and Factiva. Overall, the digital holdings for the Library consist of more than a petabyte of data as of 2015.

NYPL cardholders can download free e-books via the SimplyE app and website. As part of the Books for All program, a limited number of books in the NYPL's collection, which have been banned elsewhere in the United States, are also available to anyone in the U.S. via the SimplyE app. The library also hosts a Teen Banned Book Club.

The library expanded its digital access initiatives in January 2026, launching free, unlimited digital access to The New York Times online for all patrons utilizing the wireless network across its 88 physical branches.

==== One NYPL ====
In 2006, the library adopted a new strategy that merged branch and research libraries into "One NYPL". The organizational change developed a unified online catalog for all the collections, and one card to that could be used at both branch and research libraries. The 2009 website and online-catalog transition had some initial difficulties, but ultimately the catalogues were integrated.

=== Community Oral History Project ===
NYPL's Community Oral History Project shares New York City's neighborhoods and diverse people by documenting history through collected stories. The Oral History Project includes people living in Greenwich Village, Harlem, Washington Heights and Inwood, Times Square, Hell's Kitchen, Soho, Lower East Side, Chinatown, and Kips Bay as well as Transgender, Latino Americans, Veterans, and Disability Experience.

=== Community outreach ===
The New York Public Library offers many services to its patrons. These include services for immigrants, as well as free work and life skills classes offered in conjunction with volunteers and partnerships at the library. In addition, the library offers non-English speakers materials and coaching for them to acclimate to the U.S. For these non-English speakers, the library offers free ESOL classes. An initiative was taken in July 2018, NYC library card holders are allowed to visit Whitney Museum, the Guggenheim and 31 other prominent New York cultural institutions for free.

=== Temporary programs ===
In June 2017, Subway Library was announced. It was an initiative between the New York Public Library, Brooklyn Public Library, Queens Public Library, the Metropolitan Transportation Authority, and Transit Wireless. The Subway Library gave New York City Subway riders access to e-books, excerpts, and short stories.

== Governance ==
Like all public libraries in New York, the NYPL is granted a charter from the Board of Regents of the University of the State of New York and is registered with the New York State Education Department. The basic powers and duties of all library boards of trustees are defined in the Education Law and are subject to Part 90 of Title 8 of the New York Codes, Rules and Regulations.

The NYPL's charter, as restated and granted in 1975, gives the name of the corporation as The New York Public Library, Astor, Lenox and Tilden Foundations. The library is governed by a board of trustees, composed of between 25 and 42 trustees of several classes who collectively choose their own successors, including ex officio the New York City Mayor, New York City Council Speaker and New York City Comptroller.

== Other New York City library systems ==
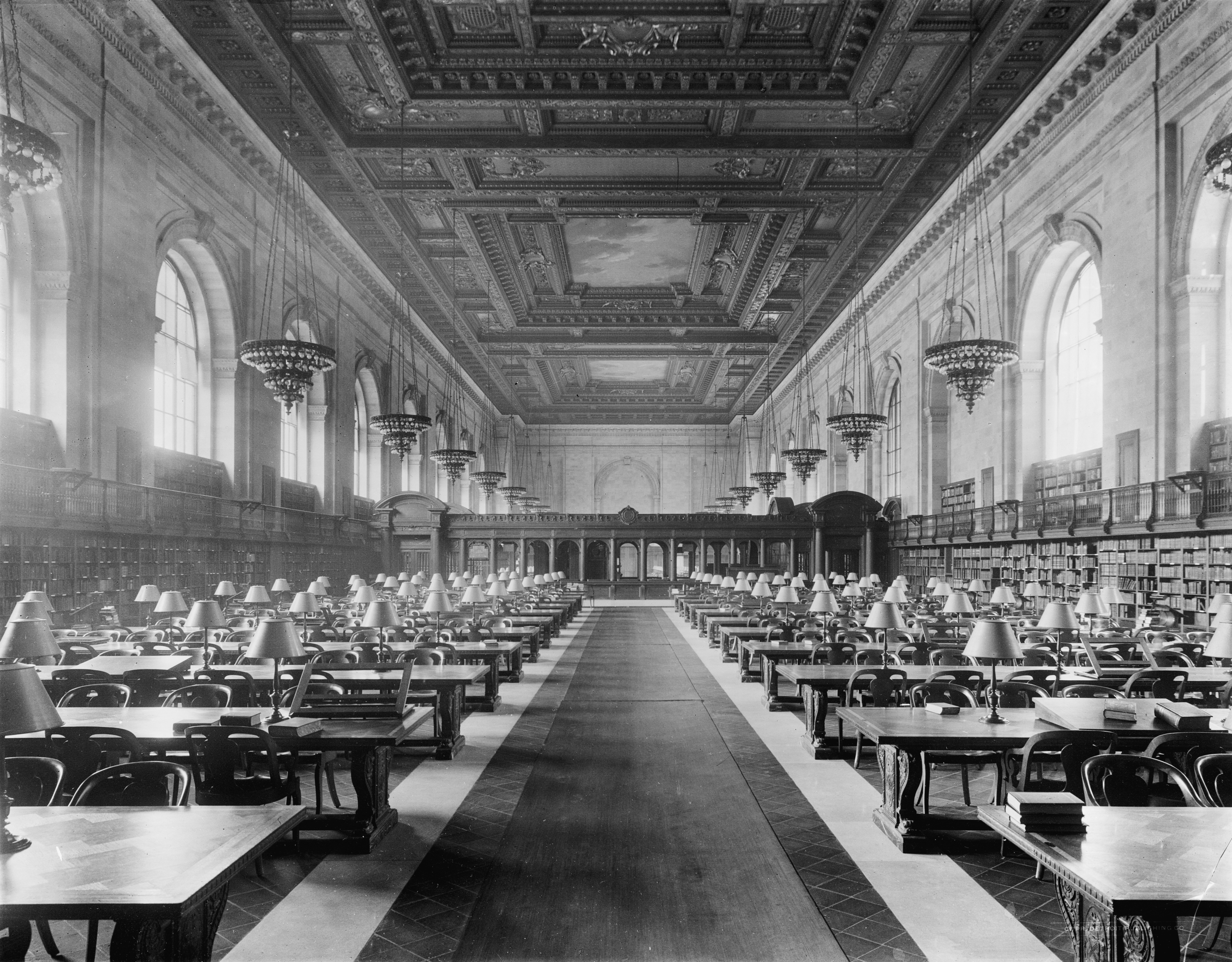
The Main Branch Reading Room, c. 1910–1920

The New York Public Library is one of three separate and independent public library systems in New York City. The other two library systems are the Brooklyn Public Library and the Queens Public Library. According to the 2006 Mayor's Management Report, New York City's three public library systems had a total library circulation of 35 million: the NYPL and BPL (with 143 branches combined) had a circulation of 15 million, and the Queens system had a circulation of 20 million through its 62 branch libraries. Altogether the three library systems hosted 37 million visitors in 2006. Taken as a whole, the three library systems in the city have 209 branches with 63 million items in their collections.

Other libraries in New York City, some of which can be used by the public, are listed in the Directory of Special Libraries and Information Centers.

== Cultural impact ==
The historian David McCullough has described the New York Public Library as one of the five most important libraries in the United States; the others are the Library of Congress, the Boston Public Library, and the university libraries of Harvard and Yale.

The New York Public Library was a founding member of the Research Libraries Group, alongside Columbia, Harvard, and Yale Libraries.

Along with Harvard, Columbia, and Princeton, NYPL is a member of the Research Collections and Preservation Consortium (ReCAP), and shares an off-site shelving facility in Plainsboro, New Jersey with the three Ivy League universities.

=== In popular culture ===
The New York Public Library has been referenced numerous times in popular culture. The library has appeared as a setting and topic multiple times in film, poetry, television, and music.

== See also ==
- Education in New York City
- Google Books Library Project
- List of museums and cultural institutions in New York City
- Benjamin Miller Collection, collection of posted stamps
- Ira D. Wallach, namesake of the Miriam and Ira D. Wallach Division of Art, Prints and Photographs
- The New York Public Library Desk Reference
- List of New York Public Library branches
- List of presidents of the New York Public Library
