= Varsity Show =

Tradition at Columbia University

The Varsity Show logo

The Varsity Show is one of the oldest traditions at Columbia University. Founded in 1893 as a fundraiser for the university's fledgling athletic teams, the Varsity Show now draws together the entire Columbia undergraduate community for a series of performances every April. Dedicated to producing a unique full-length musical that skewers and satirizes many dubious aspects of life at Columbia, the Varsity Show is written and performed exclusively by university undergraduates. Various renowned playwrights, composers, authors, directors, and actors have contributed to the Varsity Show, either as writers or performers, while students at Columbia, including Richard Rodgers, Oscar Hammerstein II, Lorenz Hart, Herman J. Mankiewicz, I. A. L. Diamond, Herman Wouk, Greta Gerwig, and Kate McKinnon.

Having previously been staged at venues including Carnegie Hall, the Waldorf-Astoria, and the Hotel Astor, the Varsity Show has been permanently based on campus since 1944. Notable past shows include Fly With Me (1920), The Streets of New York (1948), The Sky's the Limit (1954), and Angels at Columbia (1994). In particular, Streets of New York, after having been revived three times, opened off-Broadway in 1963 and was awarded a 1964 Drama Desk Award. The Mischief Maker (1903), written by Edgar Allan Woolf and Cassius Freeborn, premiered at Madison Square Garden in 1906 as Mam'zelle Champagne.

== History ==
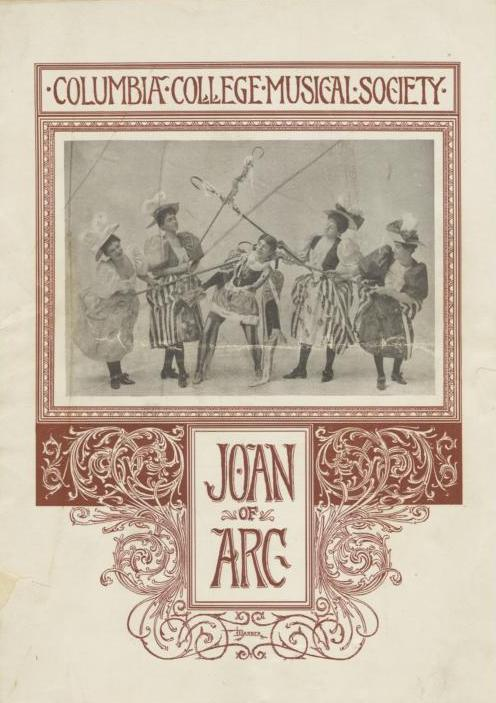
The program for Joan of Arc (1894), the first Varsity Show, co-written by Guy Wetmore Carryl and Kenneth MacKenzie Murchison

=== Founding ===
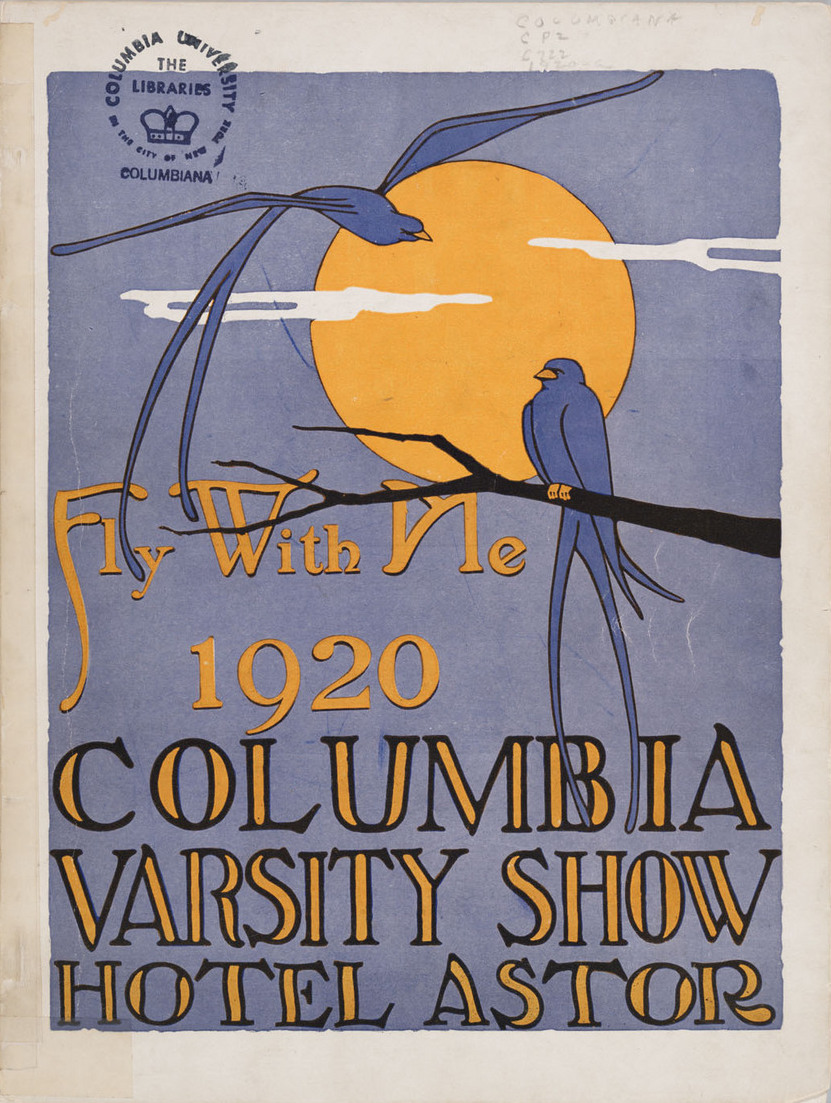
The program for Fly With Me (1920), one of the only collaborations between Richard Rodgers, Oscar Hammerstein II, and Lorenz Hart

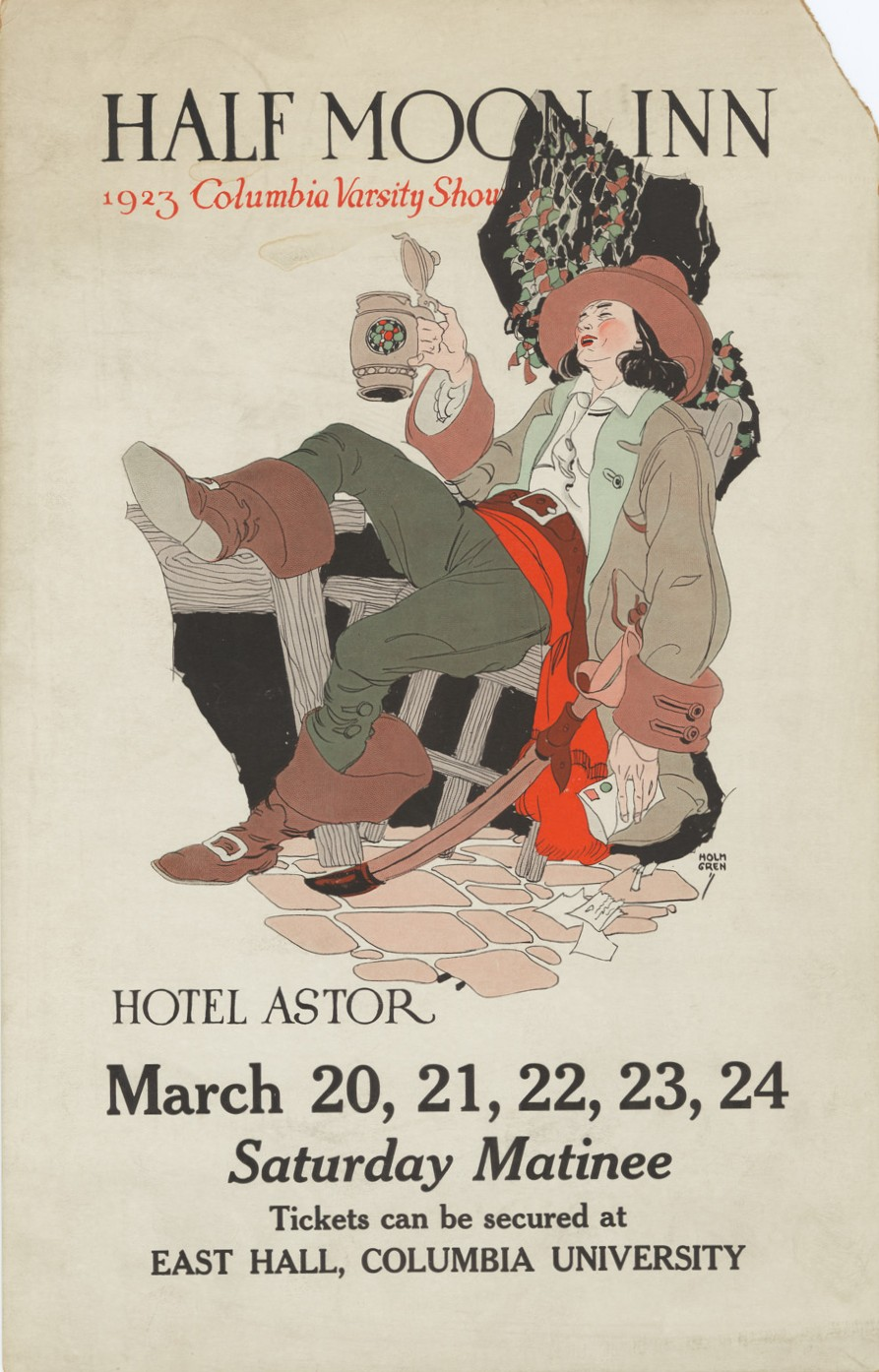
The poster for Half Moon Inn (1923), for which the tune for "Roar, Lion, Roar" was originally written

The Columbia College Dramatic Club (the "Strollers"), the predecessor to the Varsity Show, was established in 1886 as a way to raise funds for the university's athletic teams. The proceeds of the club's first performance were donated to the university rowing team. Though originally founded as an undergraduate organization, the Strollers soon began admitting members who had already graduated into the cast, in addition to professional actors; it stopped contributing to university athletics around 1890, instead keeping the money it raised for itself, having grown into a semi-professional theater company with only a tenuous relationship with the college. The issue of funding for athletics had deteriorated to the point where the Columbia Lions football and men's rowing teams had ceased operations in 1892.

In response, the undergraduate student body formed the Columbia College Music Society in 1893, which was to perform burlesques entirely written and performed by students. The first show, Joan of Arc, or The Monarch, The Maid, The Minister, and The Magician, written by Guy Wetmore Carryl and Kenneth MacKenzie Murchison, debuted on April 2, 1894. The show was first dubbed the "Varsity Show" in 1900 with the performance of The Governor's Vrouw, written by Henry Sydnor Harrison, Melville Henry Cane, and John Erskine.

The lyrics and book of the 1903 Varsity Show, The Mischief Maker, were written by Edgar Allan Woolf, and set to music by Cassius Freeborn. It moved to Broadway three years later, with its all-male student cast replaced with traditional casting, under the name Mam'zelle Champagne. It was during its premiere at Madison Square Garden that architect Stanford White, whose firm had designed Columbia's Morningside Heights campus, was shot by Harry Kendall Thaw.

=== Rodgers, Hammerstein, and Hart ===
The music for the 1920 Varsity Show, Fly With Me, was written by Richard Rodgers and Lorenz Hart. Since the book for the play was considered inadequate by the judges, the tunes were adapted to another entry, written by Philip Leavitt and Milton Kroopf. During the editing process, alumnus and judge Oscar Hammerstein II, who had first appeared in the Varsity show in the 1915 production, On Your Way, added two of his own songs to the musical, "There's Always Room For One More" and "Weaknesses". This incident marked the first instance of collaboration between Rodgers and Hammerstein, a partnership that would go on to initiate the "golden age" of musical theater in the 20th century. The writing of Fly With Me was one of the only collaborations between all three men. The next year, Rodgers and Hart co-wrote the Varsity Show again.

Rodgers was the first freshman to write any portion of the Varsity Show, and would later cite his participation in the show as his sole reason for choosing to attend Columbia, writing:

... the Varsity Show at Columbia offered a boy like me something no other school in the country could supply: an almost professional production. There were experienced directors, a beautifully equipped stage with good lighting situated in the heart of the Broadway theatre district, and best of all, professional musicians in the pit.

The three men collaborated again for the 1921 show, You'll Never Know, with Rodgers writing the music, Hart the lyrics, and Hammerstein as "Director of Production". This was the only show where all three men worked together directly.

=== Later history ===
The 1948 Varsity Show, The Streets of New York, co-written by Alan Koehler and Joseph Meredith and with music by Richard Chodosh and Phil Springer, was so popular upon its premiere that it was revived three times (1952, 1958, 1961). A version of it opened at the Maidman Playhouse in 1963, and was awarded the 1964 Drama Desk Special Award.

The Columbia University Bicentennial was celebrated in 1954. That year's Varsity Show saw the return of a number of alumni contributors, including Roy Webb, Kenneth Webb, Howard Dietz, Arthur Schwartz, I. A. L. Diamond, Herman Wouk, and Chodosh. It recounted the history of the university since its founding, with scenes such as "The Revolutionary War and Who Won It", "Barnard College is Founded for Good Reasons", and "Football is Banned at Morningside".

In 1968, the Varsity Show was cancelled due to the large-scale protests at the university that year, and would not stage another performance until 1978. The next performance, a revival of Fly With Me, was in 1980, the 60th anniversary of the musical. 1982 saw two Varsity Shows: College on Broadway, which stitched together several shows from earlier in the century, and Columbia Graffiti, a low-key, one-hour production that was accompanied by only a piano; due to the success of that year's shows, another production, Fear of Scaffolding, was made the next year, and, combined with Columbia Graffiti, was performed on Dean's Day 1983 before an alumni audience.In response, the Class of 1920, headed by President Arthur Snyder, who had performed in the original production of Fly With Me, donated their class treasury to create a prize fund to support future productions of the Varsity Show, fully reviving the tradition.

The Varsity Show's centennial production, Angels at Columbia, in 1994, included performances by several celebrities, including former vice-presidential nominee Geraldine Ferraro, former New York City Mayor David Dinkins, NBC news anchor Jane Pauley, and sports journalist Len Berman.

=== The pony ballet ===
From its inception, the Varsity Show had been an all-male production, and always featured cross-dressing. The high point of every show was the pony ballet, a type of kickline routine. This often involved athletes, especially football players, who became increasingly involved as the pretense of appearing passingly female was slowly dropped over time. They apparently took their roles very seriously, and, according to football coach John F. Bateman, who was a pony in the Fair Enough (1939), would practice three hours every day in preparation for their roles.

Though Columbia College only started admitting women in 1983, Barnard College had been founded nearly a century earlier in 1889, and Teachers College had been coeducational since its founding in 1887. Women performed in the Varsity Show in the 1936 production, Off Your Marx, and were met with great applause. However, during the 1937 show, Some of the People, undergraduates reportedly shooed the female cast members off stage by pelting them with bananas and pennies. The presence of women in the Varsity Show only returned in 1956, and the show has been coeducational since. The pony ballet was revived in 1988, and has since appeared on and off.

=== Venues ===
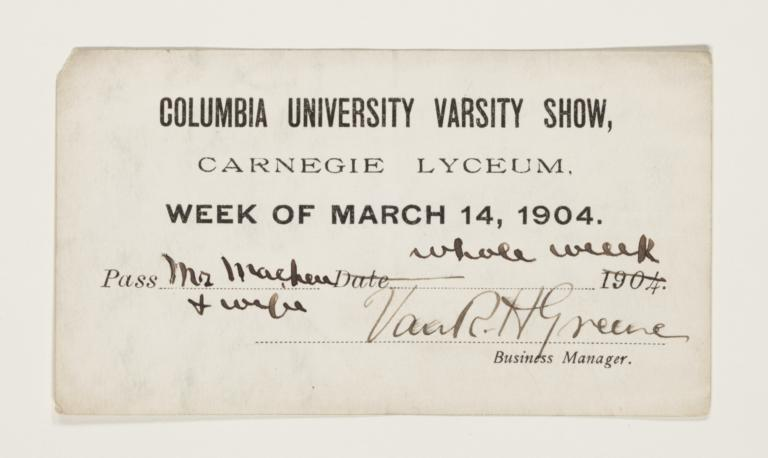
Ticket for Isle of Illusia (1904), which ran during the week of March 14, 1904 at Carnegie Hall

Since the university had no dedicated performance spaces on campus, the first Varsity Show, Joan of Arc, premiered in 1894 at the theater of the Manhattan Athletic Club. The planned 1895 show, The Buccaneer, was slated to be performed at the same venue; however, this was objected to by the authors of the show, who complained that the space was too cramped, as well as by its two lead actors. Due to the impasse, the show for that year was cancelled, and was instead performed in 1896. An 1894 plan for the university's new Morningside Heights campus proposed the construction of an academic theater at the level of 118th Street; it never materialized.

The lack of an adequate performance space on campus continued through the first half of the 20th century, during which the Varsity Show was staged at various venues around the cities, including Carnegie Hall, the Waldorf-Astoria, and the Hotel Astor. The university's now-demolished Brander Matthews Theatre was constructed in 1940, and the production permanently moved onto campus in 1944. Later on, the Varsity Show would move into the McMillin Theatre in Dodge Hall, and then Ferris Booth Hall. In 2023, the show was performed in the Roone Arledge Auditorium of Alfred Lerner Hall.

Prior to 1967, the Varsity Show occasionally went on tours around the country, performing in cities including Pittsburgh and Washington, D.C. The 1901 show is recorded to have taken a tour through Connecticut, with its first performance in New Haven.

== Past Varsity Shows ==
- 1894: Joan of Arc
- 1896: The Buccaneer
- 1897: Cleopatra
- 1899: Varsity Show
- 1900: The Governor's Vrouw
- 1901: The Princess Proud
- 1902: The Vanity Fair
- 1903: The Mischief Maker
- 1904: The Isle of Illusia
- 1905: The Khan of Kathan
- 1906: The Conspirators
- 1907: The Ides of March
- 1908: Mr. King
- 1909: In Newport
- 1910: The King of Hilaria
- 1911: Made in India
- 1912: The Mysterious Miss Apache
- 1913: The Brigands
- 1914: The Merry Lunatic
- 1915: On Your Way
- 1916: The Peace Pirates
- 1917: Home, James
- 1918: Ten for Five
- 1919: Take a Chance
- 1920: Fly with Me
- 1921: You'll Never Know
- 1922: Steppe Around
- 1923: Half Moon Inn
- 1924: Old King's
- 1925: Half Moon Inn (revival)
- 1926: His Majesty, The Queen
- 1927: Betty Behave
- 1928: Zuleika, or the Sultan Insulted
- 1929: Oh, Hector
- 1930: Heigh-ho Pharaoh
- 1931: Great Shakes
- 1932: How Revolting!
- 1933: Home, James
- 1934: Laugh it Off!
- 1935: Flair-Flair: The Idol of Paree
- 1936: Off Your Marx
- 1937: Some of the People
- 1938: You've Got Something There
- 1939: Fair Enough
- 1940: Life Begins in '40
- 1941: Hit the Road
- 1942: Saints Alive
- 1944: On the Double
- 1945: Second the Motion
- 1946: Step Right Up
- 1947: Dead to Rights
- 1948: Streets of New York
- 1949: Mr. Oscar
- 1950: Wait For It
- 1951: Babe in the Woods
- 1952: Streets of New York (revival)
- 1953: Shape of Things
- 1954: Sky's the Limit
- 1955: When in Rome
- 1956: Not Fit to Print
- 1957: The Voice of the Sea
- 1958: Streets of New York (revival)
- 1959: Dig That Treasure
- 1960: A Little Bit Different
- 1961: Streets of New York (revival)
- 1963: Elsinore
- 1964: Il Troubleshootore
- 1965: Destry Rides Again
- 1966: The Bawd's Opera
- 1967: Feathertop
- 1978: The Great Columbia Riot of '78
- 1980: Fly With Me (revival)
- 1982: College on Broadway
- 1982: Columbia Graffiti
- 1983: Fear of Scaffolding
- 1984: The New 'U'
- 1985: Lost in Place
- 1987: From Here to Uncertainty
- 1988: The Bonfire of Humanities
- 1989: Sans Souci, Be Happy
- 1990: Behind the Lion Curtain
- 1991: The Silence of the Lions
- 1992: Columbia U, 10027
- 1993: The Lion Game
- 1994: Angels at Columbia: Centennial Approaches
- 1995: Step Inside
- 1996: Devil in a Light Blue Dress
- 1997: Enlargement and Enhancement: The Scaffolding Years
- 1998: Love is Indefinite
- 1999: Beyond Oedipus: Leaving the Womb
- 2000: Mo' Money, Mo' Problems
- 2001: Sex, Lions, and Videotape
- 2002: The 108th Annual Varsity Show
- 2003: Dial 'D' for Deadline
- 2004: Off-Broadway
- 2005: The Sound of Muses
- 2006: Misery Loves Columbia
- 2007: Insufficient Funds
- 2008: Morningside Hates
- 2009: The Gates of Wrath
- 2010: College Walk of Shame
- 2011: Another Scandal!
- 2012: The Corporate Core
- 2013: The Great Netscape
- 2014: Morningside Nights
- 2015: Almageddon
- 2016: A King's College
- 2017: A Tale of Two Colleges
- 2018: Lights Out on Broadway
- 2019: It’s a Wonderful Strife
- 2020: We Hope This Musical Finds You Well
- 2021: Campus in the Cloud
- 2022: Well Endowed
- 2023: Transfer of Power
- 2024: MAYDAY
- 2025: Morningside Heist
- 2026: Once on a Blue Moon

== Notable alumni ==
The following is a list of people who have written, performed, directed, worked backstage, or otherwise been associated with the show. The year beside each name indicates the year(s) of their involvement; if unknown, listed instead is their degree and year of graduation.

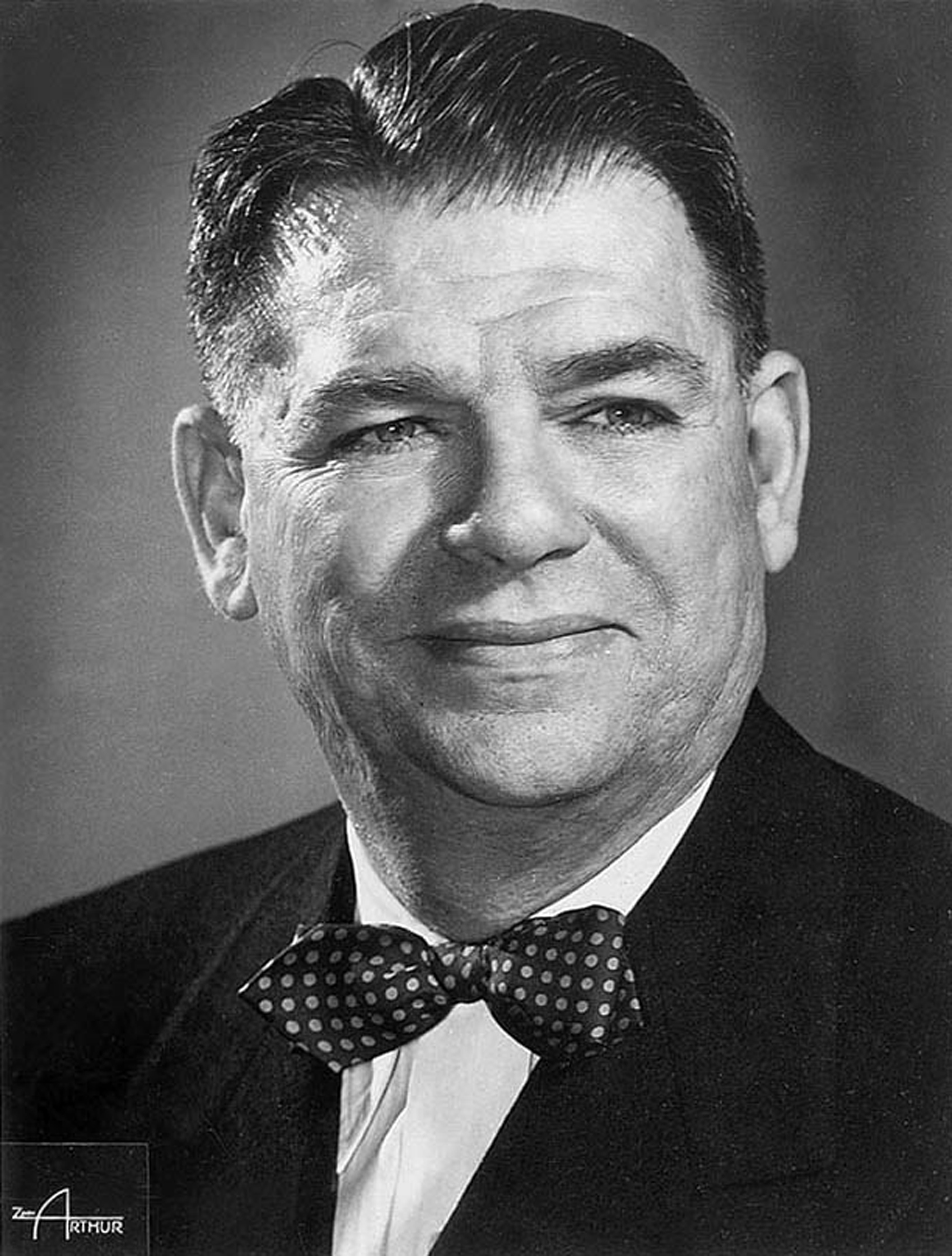
Oscar Hammerstein II

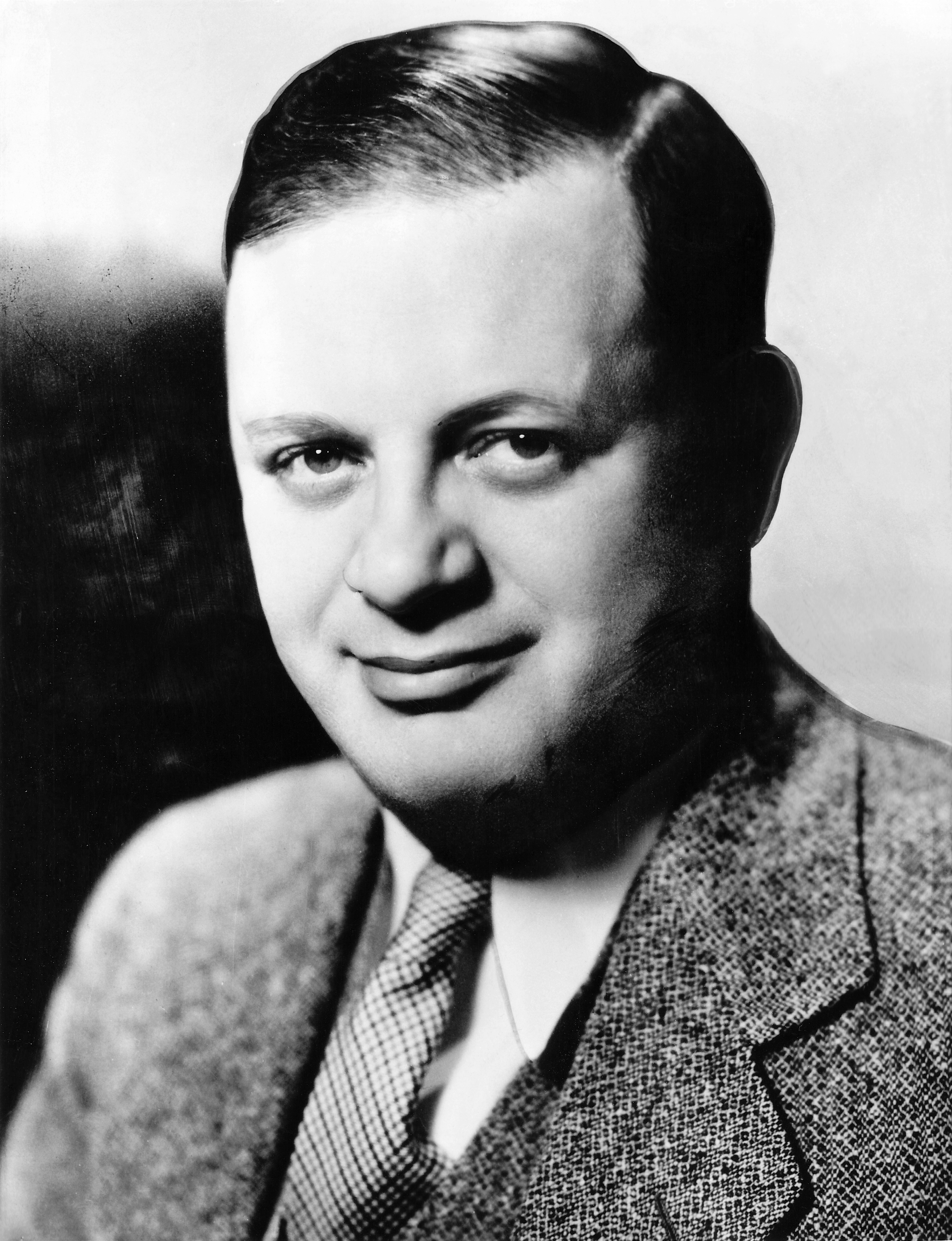
Herman J. Mankiewicz

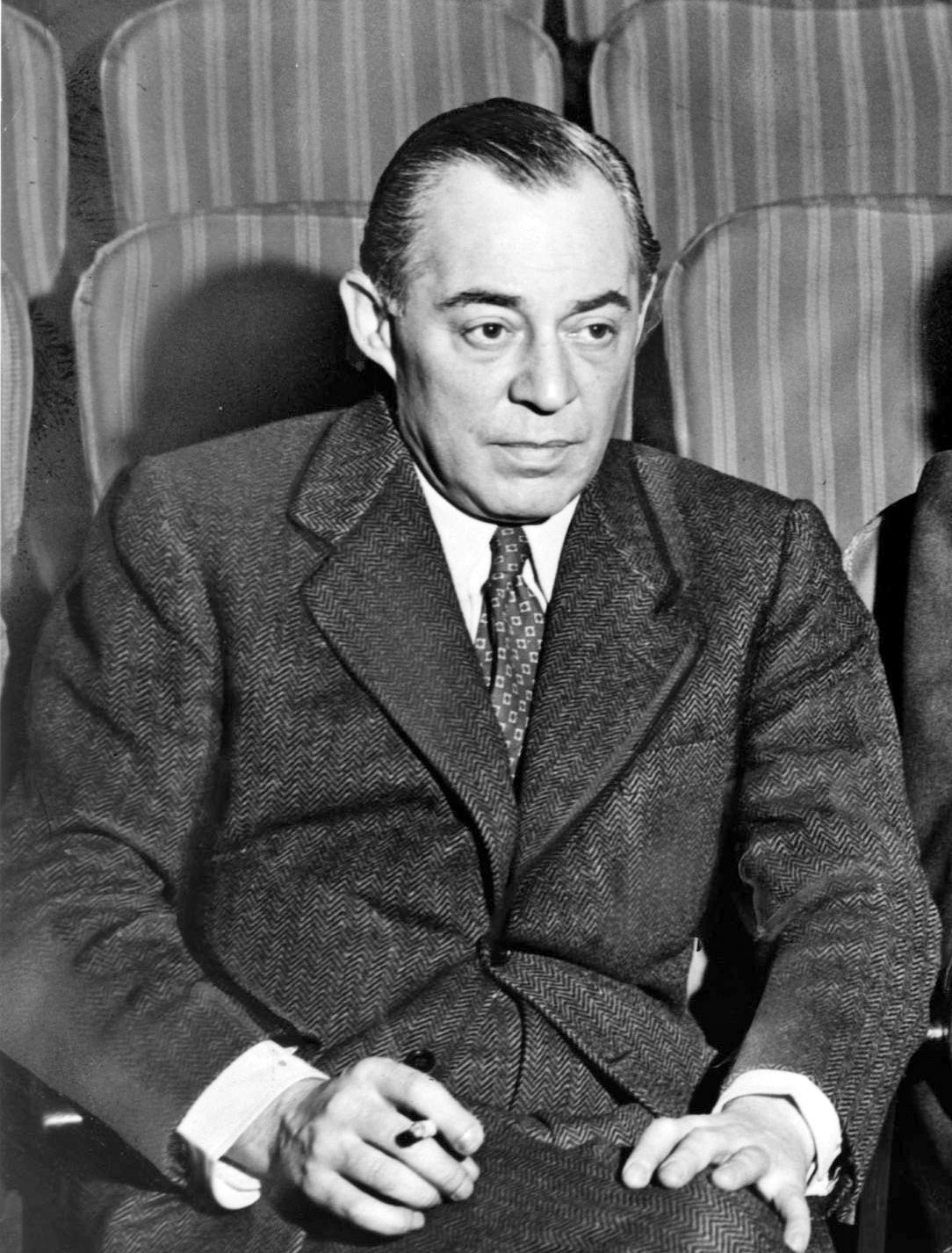
Richard Rodgers

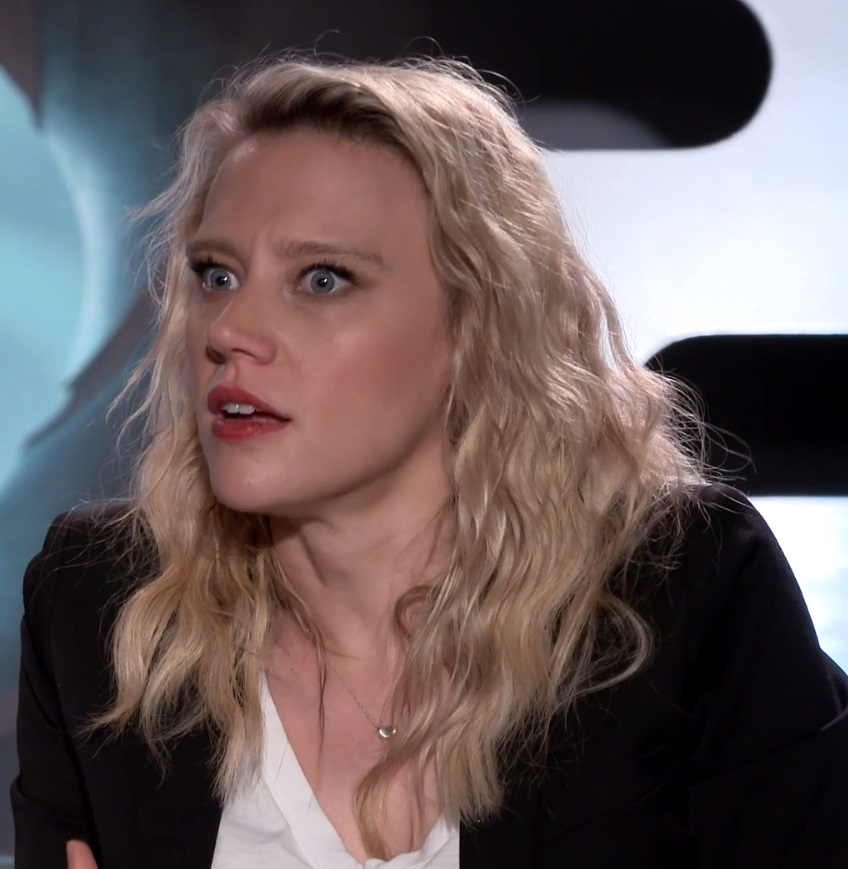
Kate McKinnon

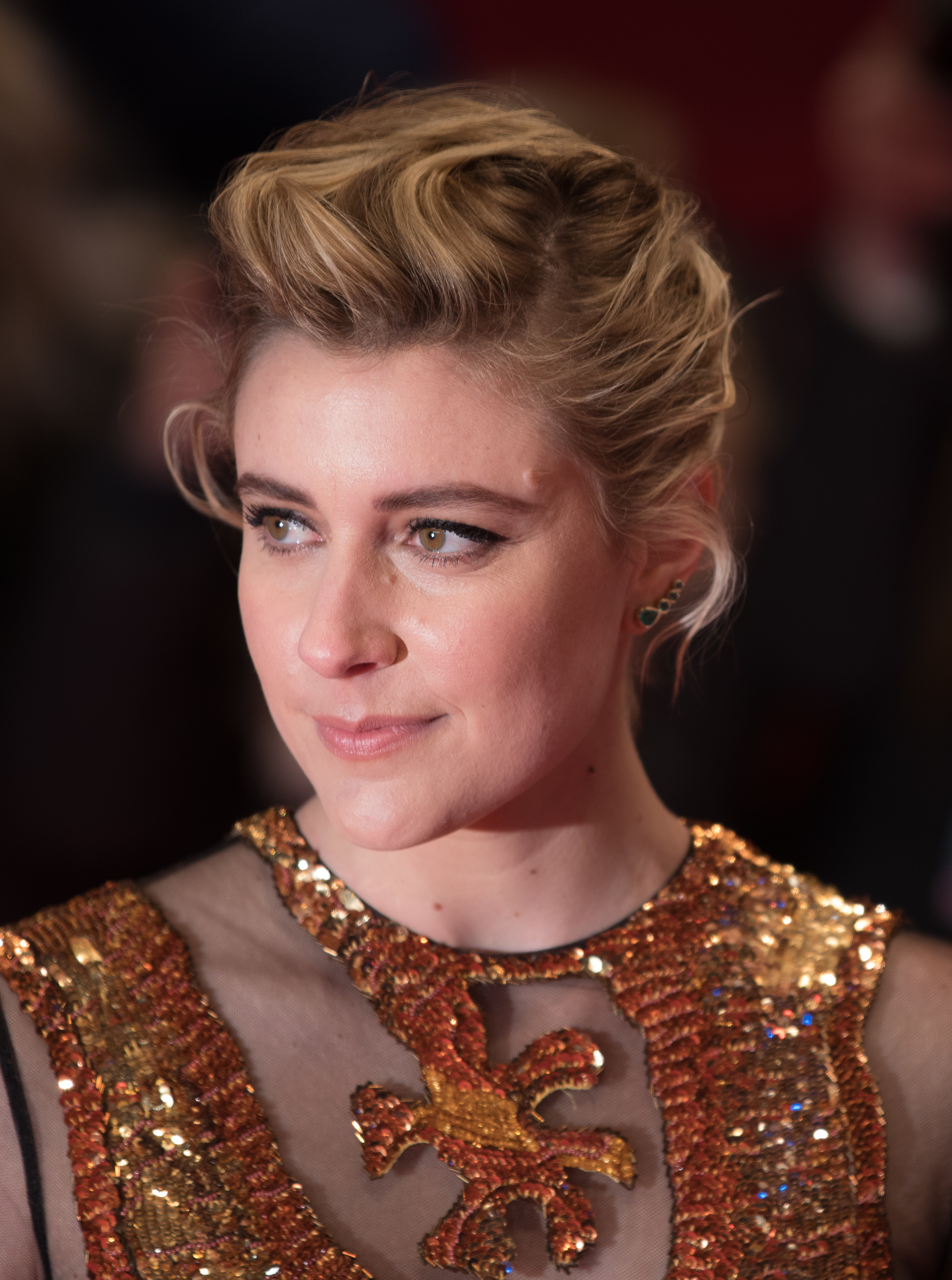
Greta Gerwig

- Guy Wetmore Carryl (1894) – author and humorist
- Kenneth MacKenzie Murchison (1894) – architect
- Henry Shrady (1896) – sculptor, best known for the Ulysses S. Grant Memorial
- Melville Henry Cane (1900) – lawyer and poet
- William C. deMille (1900) – president of the Academy of Motion Picture Arts and Sciences
- John Erskine (1900) – pioneer of the Great Books program
- Henry Sydnor Harrison (1900) – novelist
- George Middleton (1901) – president of the Dramatists Guild of America
- Edgar Allan Woolf (1903) – co-screenwriter of The Wizard of Oz
- Arthur Garfield Hays (1903) – lawyer, represented the American Civil Liberties Union at the Scopes Monkey Trial
- Frank D. Fackenthal (1904, 1906) – acting president of Columbia University
- Roi Cooper Megrue (1904) – playwright and author
- Philip Moeller (1904) – stage producer, director, playwright, and screenwriter
- Ralph Morgan (1904, 1905) – actor, first president of the Screen Actors Guild
- Kenneth Webb (1904, 1905, 1906, 1909, 1915, 1917, 1919, 1954) – film director
- William B. Davidson (1907) – actor
- Niles Welch (1908) – actor
- Dixon Ryan Fox (1909) – president of Union College
- Edward Everett Horton (1909) – character actor
- Roy Webb (1909, 1915, 1919, 1923, 1954) – film score composer, works including Abe Lincoln in Illinois, Notorious, and Marty
- Oscar Hammerstein II (1915, 1916, 1917, 1920, 1921) – lyricist
- Lorenz Hart (1916, 1920, 1921) – lyricist of "My Funny Valentine", "Bewitched, Bothered and Bewildered" and other Broadway standards
- Herman Mankiewicz (1916) – co-writer of Citizen Kane
- Howard Dietz (1917, 1954) – lyricist for Dancing in the Dark and head of publicity for MGM, who created Leo the Lion
- Richard Rodgers (1920, 1921) – songwriter
- Corey Ford (1923) – humorist who named Eustace Tilley, the mascot of The New Yorker magazine
- Albert Maltz (1927) – one of the Hollywood Ten and screenwriter for Destination Tokyo
- Jacques Barzun (1928) – cultural historian
- Arnold M. Auerbach (1932) – comedy writer
- William Ludwig (1932) – screenwriter for The Great Caruso and Oscar co-winner for Interrupted Melody
- Herman Wouk (1933, 1934, 1954) – Pulitzer Prize-winning author of The Caine Mutiny
- John La Touche (1935) – lyricist for Cabin in the Sky and The Golden Apple
- Martin Manulis (1935) – television producer and creator of Playhouse 90
- Carl Emil Schorske (1936) – historian
- Robert Lax (1938) – minimalist poet
- John F. Bateman (1939) – football player and coach
- Sid Luckman (1939) – Chicago Bears quarterback
- I.A.L. Diamond (1938, 1939, 1940, 1941) – Oscar-winning screenwriter; co-writer of The Apartment and The Fortune Cookie
- Gerald Green (1942) – writer of Holocaust
- Sorrell Booke (1947) – actor, known for playing Boss Hogg in The Dukes of Hazzard
- Edward N. Costikyan (1947) – political advisor
- Dick Hyman (1947) – Emmy-winning composer
- Ernest Kinoy (1947) – screenwriter
- Philip Springer (1948, 1950) – American composer who wrote the Christmas song, Santa Baby
- Henry Littlefield (1954) – author and historian
- Arthur Schwartz (1954) – composer and film producer
- Michael Kahn (1960) – theater director, artistic director for the Shakespeare Theatre Company
- Edward Kleban (1960) – lyricist for A Chorus Line
- Terrence McNally (1960) – Tony Award-winning playwright
- Michael Feingold (1966) – theater critic and playwright
- Jon Bauman (1966, 1967) – singer, member of Sha Na Na
- Alexa Junge (1984, 1985) – writer and producer of Friends and The West Wing
- David Rakoff (1984) – comedic essayist
- Jeanine Tesori (1984, 1985) – composer and musical arranger
- Alex Kuczynski (1990) – styles reporter for The New York Times
- Eric Garcetti (BA 1992) – 42nd mayor of Los Angeles; wrote the show for two years
- Len Berman (1994, guest performance) – sports journalist
- David Dinkins (1994, guest performance) – 106th mayor of New York City
- Geraldine Ferraro (1994, guest performance) – congresswoman and former vice-presidential nominee
- Tom Kitt (1994) – Tony Award-winning composer of Next To Normal
- Brian Yorkey (1994) – playwright and lyricist
- Jane Pauley (1994, guest performance) – NBC news anchor
- Will Graham (1999, 2000, 2001, 2002) – co-creator of Onion News Network and Peabody Award winner
- Donna Vivino (1999) – actress in Wicked
- Lang Fisher (2000, 2001, 2002) – co-creator of Never Have I Ever and Peabody Award winner
- Susanna Fogel (2001) – Directors Guild of America Awards-winning director
- Brandon Victor Dixon (2002) – Tony Award-winning and Emmy-nominated actor
- Gabe Liedman (2002) – comedian, creator of Q-Force
- Kelly McCreary (2002) – actress on Grey's Anatomy
- Robby Mook (2002) – campaign manager for Hillary Clinton's 2016 presidential campaign
- Tze Chun (2003) – director
- Peter Koechley (2003) – co-founder of Upworthy and former managing editor of The Onion
- Kate McKinnon (2003, 2004, 2005) – actress on Saturday Night Live and The Big Gay Sketch Show
- Raamla Mohamed (2003) – television writer
- Jenny Slate (2003) – cast member, Saturday Night Live
- Greta Gerwig (2004, 2005) – Golden Globe and Oscar-nominated director

== In popular culture ==
The 1920 F. Scott Fitzgerald short story "Head and Shoulders" depicts a performance of the 1917 Varsity Show, Home, James, written by Hammerstein and Herman Axelrod, in which the character Marcia Meadows is an actress. In the story, the play is turned into a fully professional production. Though the scene takes place at the Shubert Theatre in New Haven, Fitzgerald may have actually watched the show at the Hotel Astor as a student at Princeton University.

The Columbia Varsity Show is satirized in the 1937 film Varsity Show.

In the 1955 Herman Wouk novel Marjorie Morningstar, the character Wally Wronken, an aspiring playwright, writes a Varsity Show, which is accepted by the judges and premieres at the Waldorf.

The fourth season of Dear White People, set at the fictional Ivy League Winchester University, centers around the staging of the university's annual Varsity Show, which is based on the Columbia tradition.
