= Melville Henry Cane =

American poet

- Born: April 15, 1879
- Died: March 10, 1980 (aged 100)
- Education: Columbia University (BA, LLB)
- Awards: Robert Frost Medal (1971)

Melville Henry Cane (April 15, 1879 – March 10, 1980) was an American poet and lawyer. He studied at Columbia University, and was the author of the influential book, Making a Poem (1953).

== Early life and education ==
As a Columbia University student in 1900, Cane worked as a reporter at the New York Evening Post and also wrote poetry. He also co-wrote the 1900 Varsity Show at Columbia, writing lyrics for the libretto The Governor's Vrouw (1900), a two-act comic opera he co-wrote with Henry Sydnor Harrison, while John Erskine write the music. Cane earned his law degree in 1903 and later specialized in copyright law.

== Career ==
Cane was a legal counsel to notable writers like Sinclair Lewis, Upton Sinclair, Ayn Rand, William Saroyan, and Thomas Wolfe and also served on the board of directors for Harcourt Brace Jovanovich Inc. Cane was also awarded the Frost Medal by the Poetry Society of America in 1971 for lifetime achievement.

Some of Cane's works are: January Garden (1926), Behind Dark Spaces (1930), And Pastures New (1956) and Snow Towards Evening (1974).

== Bibliography ==
- Behind dark spaces. Harcourt, Brace and company. 1930.
- Poems: New and Selected. Harcourt, Brace. 1938.
- Making a Poem: An Inquiry Into the Creative Process. Harcourt, Brace. 1953.
- And pastures new: a collection of poems. Harcourt, Brace. 1956. ISBN 9780151068388.
- Sinclair Lewis; John Erskine; Thomas Wolfe; Harry Houdini (1956). Reminiscences of Melville Henry Cane.
- Bullet-hunting, and other new poems. Harcourt, Brace. 1960. ISBN 9780151148370.
- To build a fire: recent poems and a prose piece. Harcourt, Brace & World. 1964.
- All and sundry: an oblique autobiography. Harcourt, Brace & World. 1968.
- Snow Toward Evening: Poems. Harcourt Brace Jovanovich. 1974. ISBN 978-0-15-683400-1.
