= Mam'zelle Champagne =

Mam'zelle Champagne is a musical revue set in Paris with book by Edgar Allan Woolf, music by Cassius Freeborn, produced by Henry Pincus, which opened June 25, 1906. On its opening night at the outdoor Madison Square Garden Roof Theatre, the millionaire scion Harry K. Thaw shot and killed the prominent architect Stanford White; the otherwise undistinguished musical's run continued for some 60 performances, largely on the publicity from this incident.

== The play ==
Directed by Lionel Lawrence, Mamzelle Champagne was Maude Fulton's Broadway debut. Viola de Costa, Eddie Fowler, Harry Short and Arthur Stanford were also in the cast. When the show was revived for four performances at the Berkeley Lyceum Theatre in October 1906, the cast included May Yohe and Robert O'Connor.

Mamzelle Champagne had been originally written for the 1903 Varsity Show by Woolf and Freeborn when they were students at Columbia University. Its original title was "The Mischief Maker". Theater critic and historian Burns Mantle later cited a letter he received from Woolf which read, "Mamzelle Champagne was my Columbia varsity show, and was transported by a manager, Henry Pincus, to the open Madison Square Roof with a professional cast. Of course, when the college boys played it, with such lines as 'I'm a good girl—you can't insult me,' every line was a howl, but spoken by actresses the howls were missing."

== The murder ==
Stanford White was a prominent New York architect, and he himself had designed the Madison Square Garden building. White was also a philanderer, and was known to have seduced Thaw's wife, the famous model and showgirl Evelyn Nesbit, and she also later alleged that White had drugged and raped her at the beginning of their relationship when she was 15 or 16 years old and that she had told her husband about it. During the opening-night performance of Mam'zelle Champagne, audience members noticed Thaw repeatedly glaring at White. Thaw eventually got up, crossed over to White's seat and shot him point-blank in the face (twice, and also in the shoulder) while the show onstage was in the midst of a number titled "I Could Love a Million Girls". It has never been established whether the subject matter of this particular song was a factor in prompting Thaw to take action at that particular moment. Thaw was eventually acquitted of murder, based on the jury believing he had been insane at the time of the shooting.

The killing is central to the plot of E. L. Doctorow's 1975 historical novel Ragtime, and in the 1981 movie veteran actor Donald O'Connor sings "I Could Love a Million Girls".

== References in pop culture ==
The song "I Could Love a Million Girls" is featured in The Simpsons season 1 episode "Homer's Night Out".

== Bibliography ==
- Baatz, Simon, The Girl on the Velvet Swing: Sex, Murder, and Madness at the Dawn of the Twentieth Century (New York: Little, Brown, 2018) ISBN 978-0316396653
- “Mamzelle Champagne”, Internet Broadway Database (ibdb.com)
- Mantle, Burns, and Garrison P. Sherwood, eds., The Best Plays of 1899–1909 (Philadelphia: The Blakiston Company), 1944.
- "The Stage and Its Players: This Week's Offerings", The New York Times, June 24, 1906, p. X6.
- "Thaw Murders Stanford White. Shoots Him on the Madison Square Garden Roof. About Evelyn Nesbit. 'He Ruined My Life', Witness Says He Said. Audience in a Panic. Chairs and Tables are Overturned in a Wild Scramble for the Exits", The New York Times, June 26, 1906, p. 1.
- The Varsity Show Website
