= The Streets of New York (musical) =

1963 musical

The Streets of New York is a musical with book and lyrics by Barry Alan Grael and music by Richard B. Chodosh. Based on the play of the same name by Dion Boucicault, it was originally written for the 1948 Varsity Show at Columbia University, with music by Chodosh and Philip Springer and book by Alan Koehler and Joseph Meredith. After its premiere, it was revived three times for the Varsity Show in 1952, 1958, and 1961. Due to its success, a new book was written for it by Gael, also a student at Columbia, while Chodosh added new music to it. This edited version opened on October 29, 1963 at the Maidman Playhouse.

The play was a "critical and popular hit", with nearly unanimously favorable reviews. Howard Taubman praised the production in The New York Times, writing that "Barry Alan Grael's lyrics are nimble and occasionally witty, and Richard B. Chodosh's music sustains the mood of well-bred spoofing," though he criticized the Boucicault story the musical was adapted from. Newsweek called the show "the brightest musical of this season and maybe next."

The Streets of New York ran for over ten months, with 318 performances, and was awarded a 1964 Drama Desk Special Award. In December 1963, it became the first musical and the first off-Broadway production to be taped and aired on pay television.
