= Philip Springer =

American composer (born 1926)

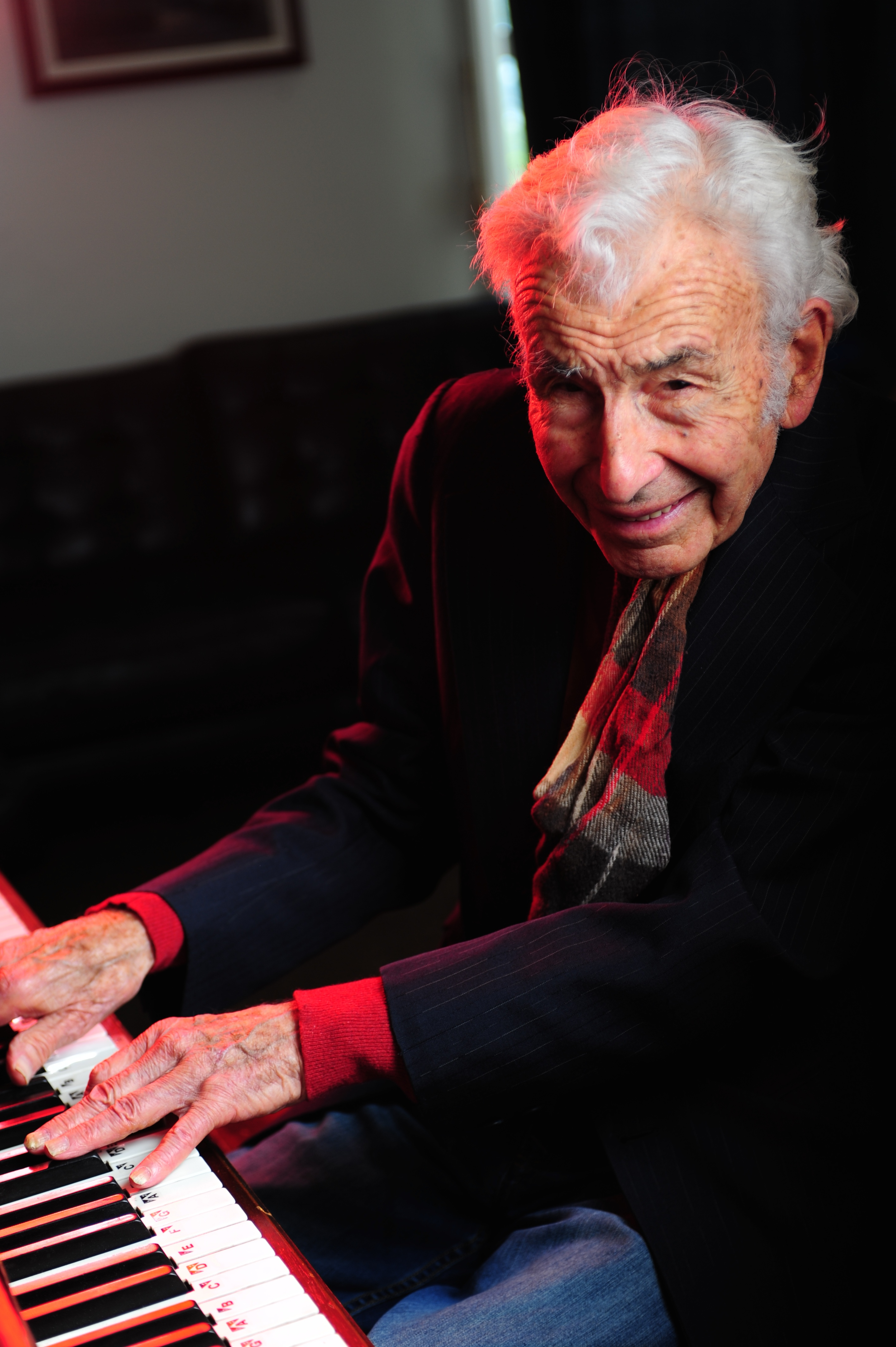
- Springer in 2021
- Born: May 12, 1926 (age 100); New York City, U.S.
- Education: Columbia College (BA); New York University (MA); University of California, Los Angeles (PhD)
- Occupations: Composer; songwriter
- Years active: 1950s–present
- Known for: "Santa Baby"
- Spouse: Judith Springer (m. 1958)
- Children: 2

Philip Springer (born May 12, 1926) is an American composer, best known for co-writing the classic Christmas song "Santa Baby". In a musical career spanning over 70 years, he is credited in 540 musical pieces, including composing songs for numerous well-known singers.

== Life and career ==
=== Early life ===
Philip Springer was born in New York City in 1926 to Jewish parents. His mother, Sylvia, was a concert pianist and his father, Mordecai, a lawyer by profession, was a very musical person. Springer's musical talent was clear from a young age; at six he played a Bach piano piece by ear. Springer went to grade and high school in Cedarhurst, Long Island, then a rustic small town. In 1944, he graduated from Lawrence High School, having been voted the best singer and the most musical person of his class in the yearbook.

=== U.S. Army service ===
Springer served as a truck driver in World War II; he was Mickey Rooney's Musical Director in 1945 when he did a show in Regensburg, Germany. When Rooney was discharged, Springer took over the job as composer. The Army show was called DON'T TOUCH THAT DIAL, and entertained thousands of GIs throughout Bavaria.

=== Education ===
Springer studied composition under Otto Luening at Columbia College, his father's alma mater, graduating in 1950. He was a resident of John Jay Hall and was roommates with Punch Sulzberger, future publisher of The New York Times. During his time at Columbia, he co-composed the music for two Varsity Shows (1948 and 1950), including The Streets of New York, and started writing songs for the popular market. He also played dual piano with pianist Dick Hyman. Springer's first top ten song was "Teasin'" (lyrics by Richard Adler) in 1950 which was recorded by Connie Haines in the US and by The Beverley Sisters in the UK.

Springer took his Master's degree at New York University, studying baroque counterpoint under Gustave Reese. He went on to earn a Ph.D. in composition at the University of California, Los Angeles (UCLA) in 1973. While at UCLA, he also studied composition under Leon Kirchner during his time as a visiting professor from Harvard University. Springer's dissertation was the first piece for small orchestra to include the ARP 2600 synthesizer.

== Music ==
=== Popular songs ===
Springer is best known for writing "Santa Baby" with lyricist Joan Javits. They were commissioned to write a Christmas song for Eartha Kitt in 1953. "Santa Baby" has since been covered by a large number of major recording artists, including Cher, Madonna, Michael Buble, Taylor Swift, Ariana Grande, Gwen Stefani, Kellie Pickler, Kylie Minogue, Robbie Williams (2019), R.E.M, Laufey (2024), and in 2016, by Garth Brooks and his wife Trisha Yearwood (featured on their Christmas duets album).

Tamir Music is Springer's publishing entity, and he owns the publishing rights to most of his songs. Tamir Music/Philip Springer owns 100% of "Santa Baby" for the United States, its territories and possessions.

Throughout his career, Springer has had extended collaborations with many highly accomplished lyric writers, such as Fred Ebb, Richard Adler, and E.Y. "Yip" Harburg, among many others. His Frank Sinatra recording "How Little it Matters, How Little We Know" was co-written by Carolyn Leigh. For several years, Springer wrote songs with Senator Orrin Hatch; Hatch dedicated their song "Headed Home" to Hatch's friend, Senator Ted Kennedy.

Springer was Yip Harburg's last collaborator before Harburg's death in 1981. Springer's collaboration with Harburg produced 15 songs, one of which, "Time You Old Gypsy Man" was called "a little known masterpiece" by Steven Holden of The New York Times in December 1989.

Some of Springer's songs recorded by well-known artists include:

- "(How Little it Matters) How Little We Know" - Frank Sinatra, lyrics by Carolyn Leigh (Sinatra recorded it at least two different times and placed it on an album of his own chosen favorites)
- "Heartbroken" - Judy Garland, lyrics by Fred Ebb
- "The Next Time" - Cliff Richard, lyrics by Buddy Kaye (No. 1 in the UK and other European countries)
- "Moonlight Gambler" - Frankie Laine, lyrics by Bob Hilliard (Top 10 Billboard)
- "All Cried Out" - Dusty Springfield, lyrics by Buddy Kaye
- "Never Ending" - Elvis Presley, lyrics by Buddy Kaye (in the 1967 Presley film Double Trouble)
- "Her Little Heart Went to Loveland" - Aretha Franklin, lyrics by Buddy Kaye
- "Oh John" - Eartha Kitt, René Marie (2014), lyrics by Fred Ebb
- "Lovin' Spree" - Eartha Kitt, lyrics by Joan Javits
- "The Day the World Stopped Turning" - Johnny Hartman, lyrics by Buddy Kaye
- "You Bring Out the Lover in Me" - Eydie Gormé, lyrics by Carolyn Leigh
- "Peek-A-Boo" – Rose Murphy, lyrics by Richard Adler – featured in international Dove soap commercial 2013-2014
- "Miracles" – Kiki Dee, lyrics by Buddy Kaye
- "Ten Good Reasons" – Donna Loren, lyrics by Buddy Kaye
- "Sweet William" – Millie Small, lyrics by Buddy Kaye
- "Not One Goodbye" – Jaye P. Morgan, lyrics by Redd Evans – number 48 on Billboard chart in 1955
- "Time" – lyrics by Buddy Kaye
- "Don't Twist with Anyone Else But Me" – in the feature film Twist Around the Clock starring Chubby Checker

Many of Springer's songs appear on the "greatest hits" albums of the recording artists of this era. A number of Springer songs were recorded and popular in foreign languages, including the French version of "The Next Time", "Apres Toi" by Richard Anthony, "Allo Maillot" by Frank Alamo and others.

=== Score writing ===
Springer composed and conducted six motion picture scores in Hollywood, including Kill a Dragon (1967); I Sailed to Tahiti with an All Girl Crew (1968); More Dead Than Alive (1969); Impasse (1969); Tell Me That You Love Me, Junie Moon (1970); and Wicked, Wicked (1973).

He also scored episodes of the television series Gunsmoke, Mannix, Then Came Bronson, and Medical Center, and composed the theme for Crosswits, a 1970s game show.

Springer has composed music for more than 20 musical shows, three of which were produced in New York City. He composed the score for the off-Broadway musical The Chosen, based on the best-selling novel by Chaim Potok, in 1988. Songs interpolated in Broadway shows include "Salesmanship" (Ziegfeld Follies of '57; lyrics by Carolyn Leigh); and "You'll Make an Elegant Butler" (Tovarich, for which he wrote the opening song for Vivien Leigh in her last Broadway performance, with lyrics by Joan Javits).

In 1963, the Metropolitan Opera baritone, George London, announced his intention to take leave from the Opera in order to make his Broadway debut in a musical written by Springer and Javits called Solomon & She. However, London died before this work could come to Broadway.

In 1999, Springer's daughter, Tamar, produced her favorite of her father's works, The Bells of Notre Dame, a musical-in-concert based on the famous Victor Hugo novel. The concert was presented with singers and a narrator, in classic song style, with lyrics by Faith Flagg and Buddy Kaye. As of 2020, Tamar Springer is currently working on a production of this musical.

=== Other compositions ===
Springer has composed many serious works, including an hour-long requiem titled "Requiem for an Artist: An American Requiem". He wrote this hour-long work in 1995 to express his grief at the recent death of his brother, artist Anthony Springer. Springer has been quoted as saying this was his greatest work.

Some of Springer's other serious works include:

- Three one-act operas;
- A Litany for narrator and instrumental ensemble;
- Over 50 electronic compositions including one of the first all-electronic television scores, broadcast on WABC called "The Space-Watch Murders";
- "Patches III", a piece for solo piano and tape, which was broadcast on KPFK radio station in 1970;
- A quadraphonic work called "American Fantasy" (piece for four loudspeakers);
- A symphonic waltz, "19th Century Waltz", which was played by the Pacific Palisades orchestra in October 2015;
- A violin concerto, which was performed at Merkin Hall with Stuart Canin as soloist.
- A composition of Psalm 121 for piano quartet and soprano which was performed at Mt. St. Mary’s College in the spring of 1971.

== Teaching ==
Springer has taught and inspired a number of musicians over the years. The famous Broadway lyricist Fred Ebb first became involved in theater as an assistant to Springer in the late 1950s, and credits Springer with teaching him how to write songs.

Springer taught electronic music at the UCLA extension from 1974 to 1986; a number of his students went on to make careers in the music world, including Eric Drew Feldman and Bill Bell. In 1981 he worked with Paul Simon, teaching him how to transcribe music.

Springer is also the author of the 1977 book Switched on Synthesizer, a widely used manual for operating analog synthesizers.

== See also ==
- List of centenarians (musicians, composers and music patrons)
