= Queed =

1911 novel by Henry Sydnor Harrison

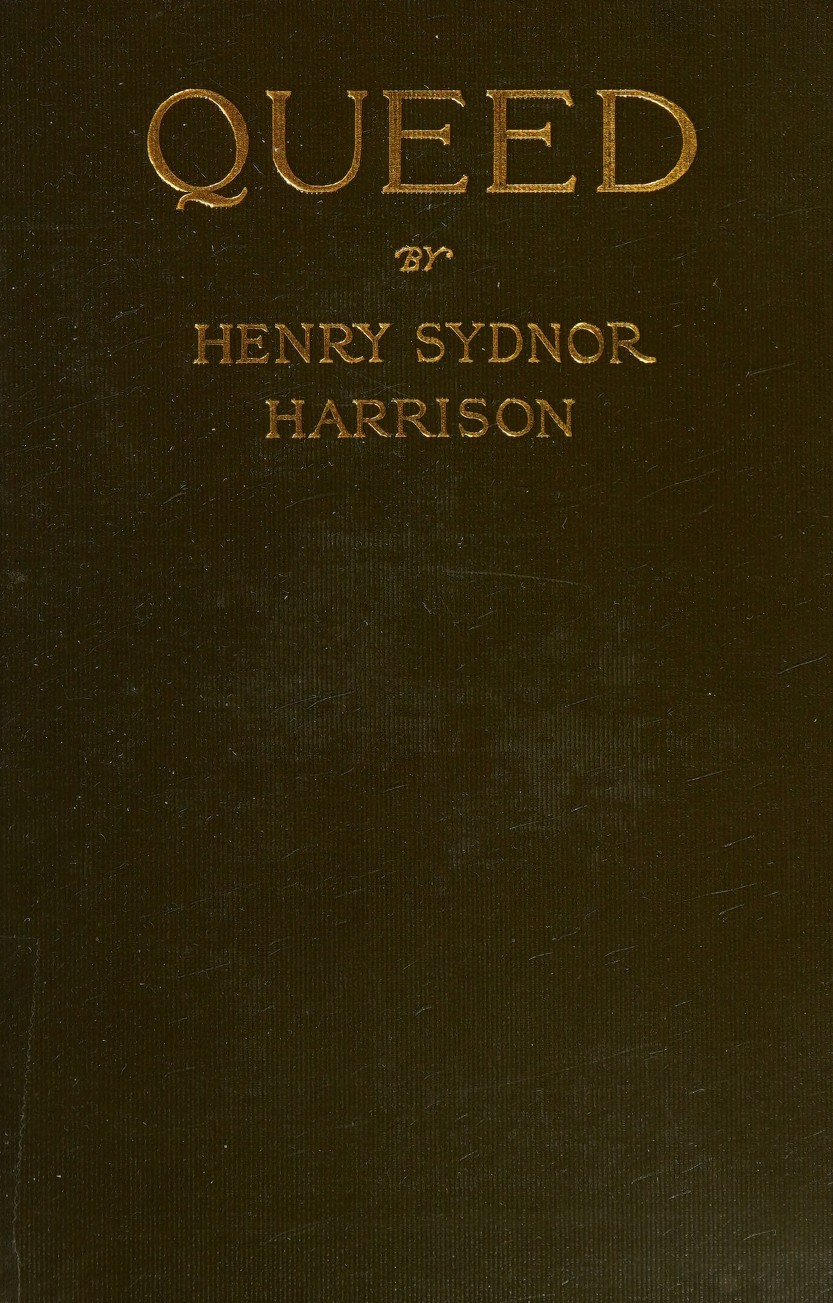
- Author: Henry Sydnor Harrison
- Illustrator: R.M. Crosby (frontispiece)
- Language: English
- Publisher: Houghton Mifflin Company
- Publication date: May 1911
- Publication place: United States
- Media type: Print (hardcover)
- Pages: 430

Queed is a 1911 novel by Henry Sydnor Harrison, which was the fourth-best selling book in the United States for 1911, and is considered one of Harrison's best novels, along with 1913's V.V.'s Eyes.

== Book ==
Queed was Harrison's second novel (after 1910's Captivating Mary Carstairs, released under a pseudonym). It is the story of an eccentric young scholar who arrives in Richmond, Virginia to seek out his unknown father, and "gradually awakens to an awareness of the complexities of Southern society and himself." The book was popular, and had favorable reviews. The Nation compared it positively to Mark Twain, and The New York Times called it "altogether an unusual performance in both its interest and ability ..." The humorous poet Arthur Guiterman wrote: "Of all the books I've chanced to read, The best, beyond comparison, Is of the misanthropic Queed, by Henry Sydnor Harrison." And while H. L. Mencken later called Harrison a "merchant of mush," he found the book to be "immensely amusing" despite some flaws.

== Stage adaptation ==
A plan to put on a stage adaptation of Queed formed and languished under Broadway producer Sam H. Harris. Actor and playwright Gilbert Emery wrote the play version, and the cast included Grant Mitchell, Clay Clement, Albert Bruning, T. Jerome Lawlor, and Walter Edwin, and was directed by Priestly Morrison. The play never made it to New York after being rated poorly in trial runs in New Jersey and Connecticut. The Asbury Park Press reviewer wrote that despite their great expectations, it was a poor play.
