= The New York Public Library Desk Reference =

The New York Public Library Desk Reference, in its fourth edition as of 2014, is a one-volume general reference work. According to the OCLC (2005 report) it is one of the most widely held general reference works by contributing libraries, ranked after multi-volume works The World Book Encyclopedia, Encyclopedia Americana and Collier's Encyclopedia, but slightly ahead of the New Encyclopædia Britannica.

== Editions ==
Excluding editions focused on specific subjects, The New York Public Library Desk Reference has been published in these years and editions:

- 1st: 1989.
- 2nd: 1993.
- 3rd: 1998.
- 4th: 2002.
