= Charter (New York) =

Authority issued by New York State Education Department

A charter is a grant of authority or rights issued by the New York State Education Department (NYSED). The organization grants provisional and absolute charters to legally establish educational corporations including schools, libraries, historical societies, and museums.

While organizations originate in different ways, usually there is a small group of people who lay down the foundation for the formal organization of the society. Such things as statement of purpose, the organizational meeting, the constitution and bylaws, incorporation, corporate title, requirements, reviewing, recommendations, and petitioning are all elements of the highly involved creation of charting a historical society.

New York, unlike all of the other US states who view cultural agencies as nonprofit businesses, has unique ways with the creation process and sees organizations such as libraries and historical societies as educational organizations. The cultural agencies in New York are a significant part of the educational system and incorporate under the Education Law rather than corporation law. These educational organizations are also created by and are subject to the Board of Regents of the University of the State of New York.

An issuance of a charter (by petitioning the Board of Regents) is necessary for any educational organization who intends on organizing as a nonprofit education corporation. In order to satisfying Regents standards of quality, they must develop and go through the provisional to absolute chartering process. The period of development starts with a provisional charter, which is a form of incorporation granted for a probationary three to five years to historical societies that have expectations of meeting Regents standards. This encourages the society to progress, and at the end of the provisional period, there is a choice to petition for extension or have the charter made absolute. An absolute charter is given to societies that meet the organizational and educational standards which leads to what is called, registration. When the organization has a record of financial stability, programmatic accomplishment, and a reputation for excellence, it is often successful in meeting the registration requirements. With this successful review and recommendation that the Regents allow an absolute charter, the historical society is then registered and gains this absolute charter. From this point on, the organization must submit annual reports in order to provide current information and accomplishments to the Regents.

== See also ==
- New York State Education Department
