= V.V.'s Eyes =

1913 novel by Henry Sydnor Harrison

- Author: Henry Sydnor Harrison
- Illustrator: Raymond M. Crosby (4 in original edition)
- Language: English
- Publisher: Houghton Mifflin Company
- Publication date: May 1913
- Publication place: United States
- Media type: Print (hardcover)
- Pages: 509

V.V.'s Eyes is a 1913 novel by Henry Sydnor Harrison, which was the second-best selling book in the United States for 1913, and is considered one of Harrison's best novels, along with 1911's Queed.

Later criticism has considered the novel (and other works of Harrison) to have pro-feminist themes.
