= Henry Sydnor Harrison =

American novelist

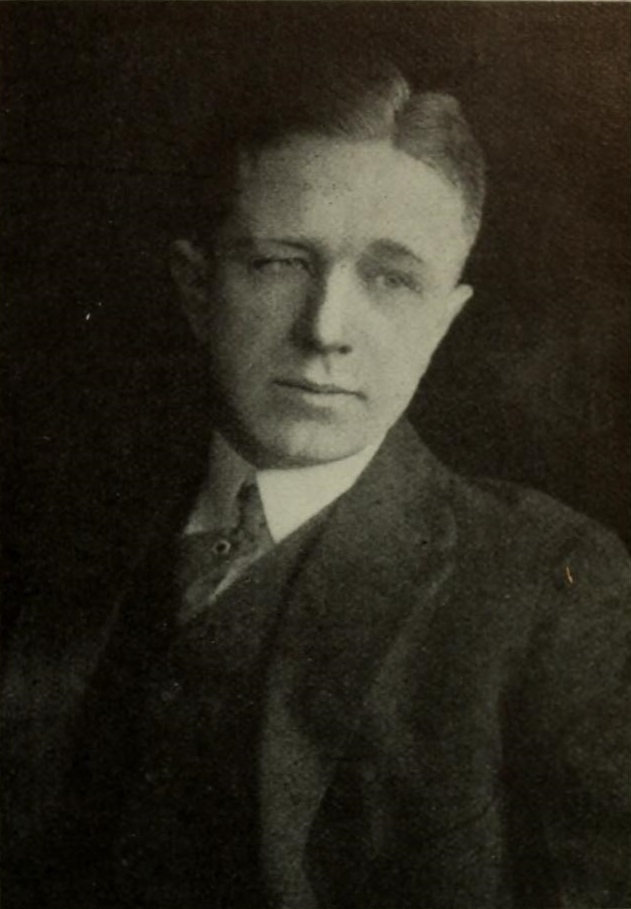
Portrait of Henry Sydnor Harrison.

Henry Sydnor Harrison (1880–1930) was an American novelist, born in Sewanee, Tennessee. He graduated from Columbia in 1900, and received an honorary A.M. from the same university in 1913. In 1914, he was elected a member of the National Institute of Arts and Letters. He wrote under the pen name "Henry Second," and made contributions to The Atlantic Monthly and other magazines. Novels written by him include Queed (1911) and V.V.'s Eyes (1913), which were very well received. Other works include Angela's Business (1915), When I Come Back (1919), Saint Teresa (1922), and Marriage (1923), a volume of short stories. Harrison also wrote a story, called "Miss Hinch", where a daring criminal and the lady after her make their way through New York City streets at midnight.
