= William Cullen Bryant Memorial =

Sculpture in Manhattan, New York, U.S.

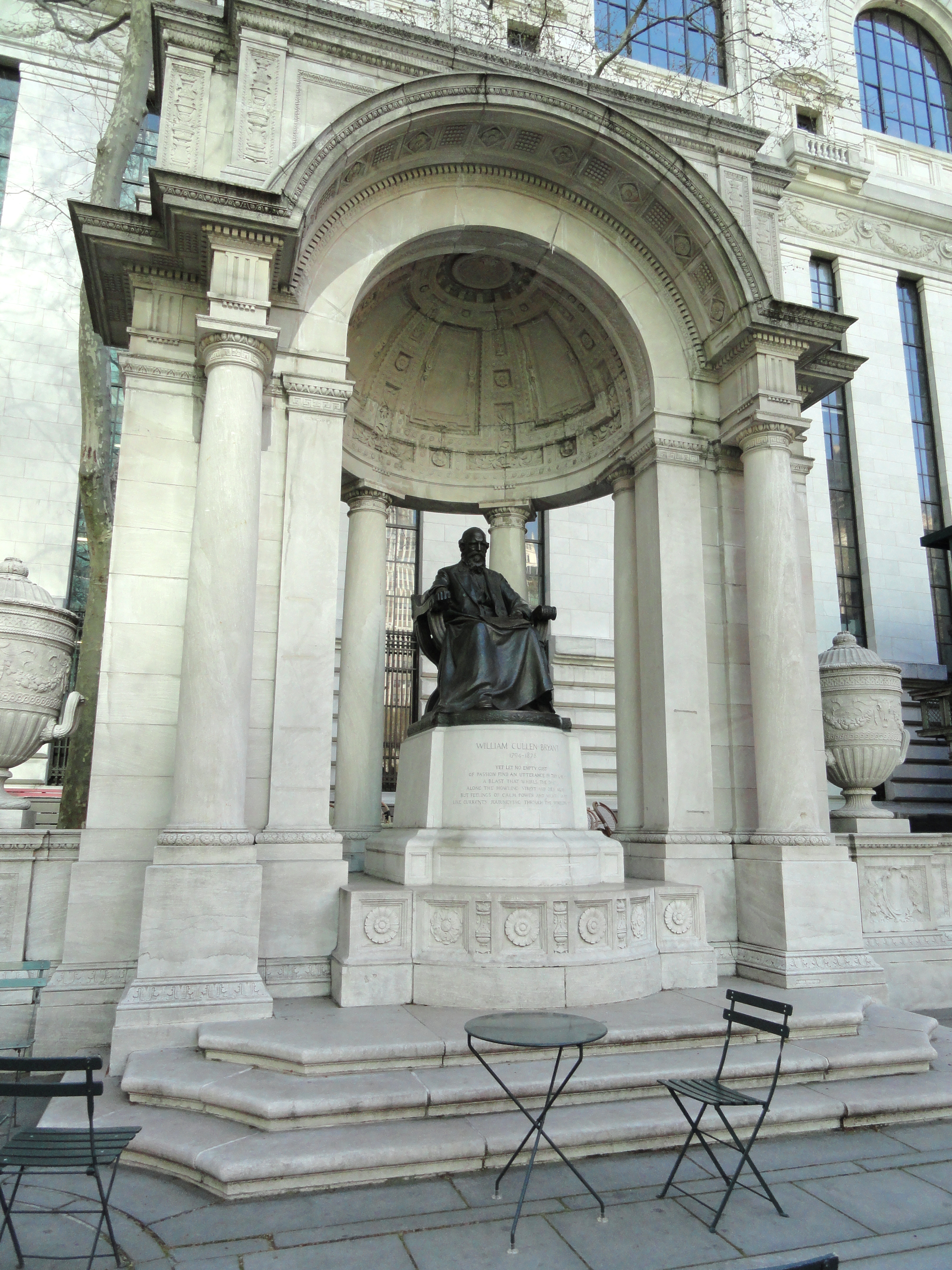
- Artist: Herbert Adams
- Completion date: 1911
- Medium: Bronze (Sculpture)
- Subject: William Cullen Bryant
- Location: New York City; 40.753384°N 73.982809°W

The William Cullen Bryant Memorial is an outdoor sculpture of William Cullen Bryant, located at Bryant Park in Manhattan, New York. The bronze statue was created by Herbert Adams and installed in 1911, the year the New York Public Library Main Branch building was completed.

The statue of William Cullen Bryant was one of the statues of “Eminent Americans” that surrounded the Palace of Fine Arts at the 1915 Panama Pacific International Exposition in San Francisco, California. The William Cullen Bryant Memorial was a bronze of the same work by Herbert Adams. A portion of Bryant's poem, Thanatopsis, is at the base of the monument behind the New York Public Library which was not a part of the 1915 Panama Pacific International Exposition work.

Adam's sculpture of Bryant is of an authoritative, elderly man in a conventional business suit with a throw on Bryant's lap suggesting he is a sedentary man, likely to retreat to his books and papers. He sits on an ancient Greek styled chair that recalls his love of the classics. The Bryant Memorial is an example of the legacy of the 1893 Columbian Exposition in Chicago which spurred the City Beautiful movement in New York.
