= Statue of Gertrude Stein =

Bronze statue in New York City

Gertrude Stein
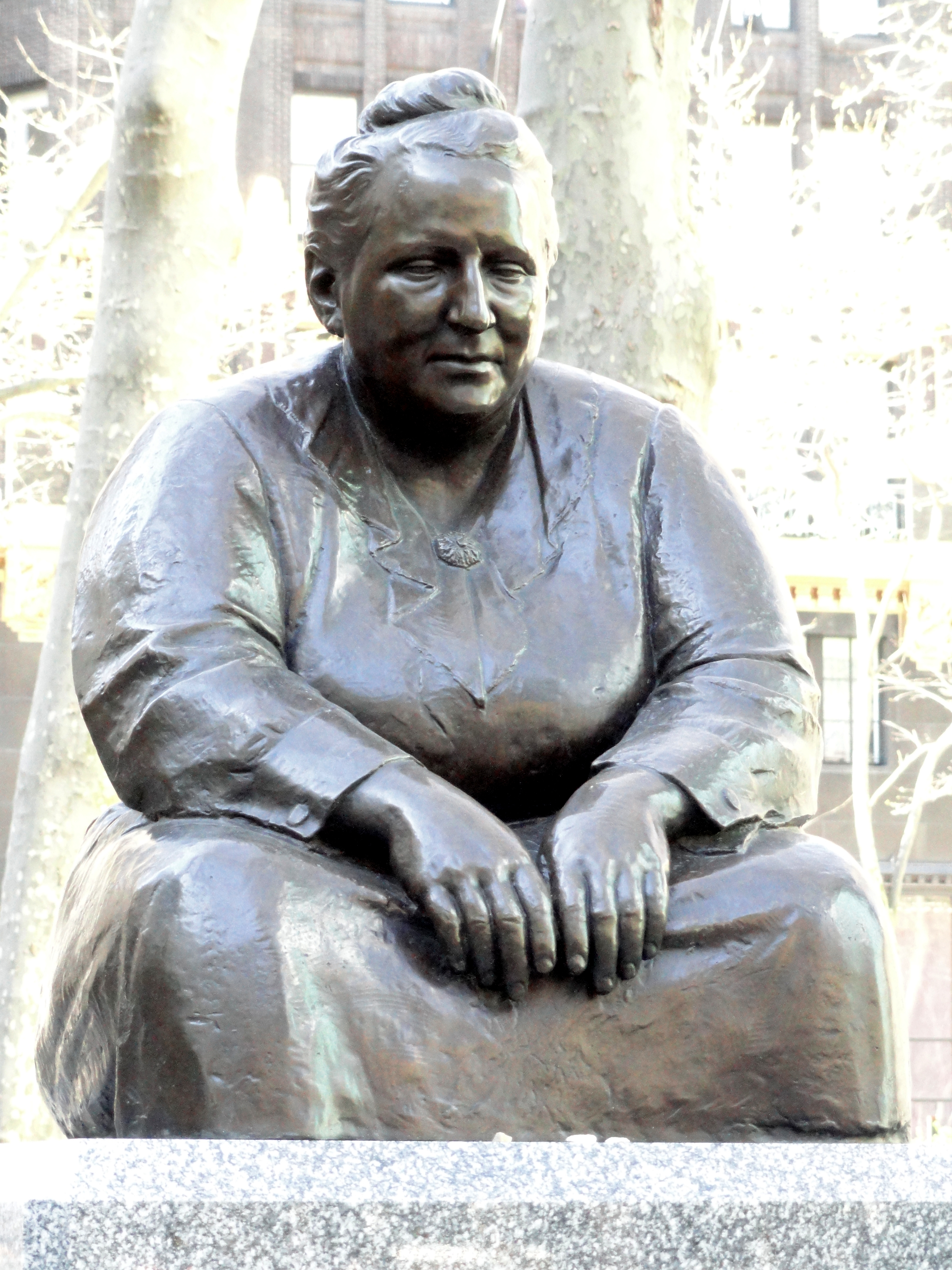
- The sculpture in 2012
- Artist: Jo Davidson
- Type: Sculpture
- Medium: Bronze
- Subject: Gertrude Stein
- Location: New York City; 40.753351°N 73.983174°W

Gertrude Stein is an outdoor bronze sculpture of Gertrude Stein, located in Bryant Park in Manhattan in New York City. The casting was installed in 1992 and is based on a model created by Jo Davidson in Paris in 1923. Its location near the New York Public Library Main Branch commemorates Stein's "significant literary contributions".

Sculptor Jo Davidson, a friend of Stein from her Paris years, aimed to represent Stein's "eternal quality", and depicted her as "a modern Buddha".

In 1993, the Lesbian Avengers installed a temporary statue of Alice B. Toklas, Stein's longtime partner, alongside the monument to "celebrate and venerate" Stein's lesbianism.

== See also ==
- 1992 in art
