= Dan Biederman =

American urban redevelopment expert

Daniel Biederman
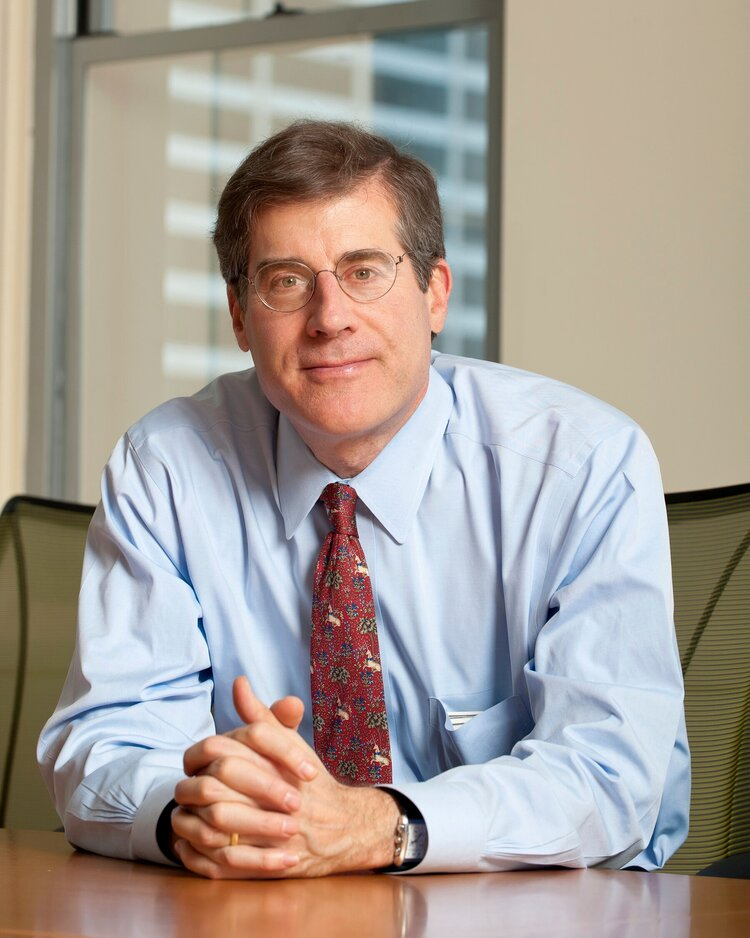
- Born: New York City, New York
- Education: B.A. Princeton University, magna cum laude M.B.A. Harvard Business School, with distinction
- Occupations: Downtown manager and urban redeveloper
- Known for: Founder: Bryant Park Corporation; 34th Street Partnership; Grand Central Partnership; Biederman Redevelopment Ventures
- Spouse: Susan Duke
- Children: Robert Biederman; Brooke Biederman

Daniel A. Biederman is an American urban redevelopment expert and public space management consultant. He is the co-founder of Grand Central Partnership, 34th Street Partnership, and Bryant Park Corporation, three business improvement districts (BIDs) and private park managers operating in Midtown Manhattan, and is also the president of Biederman Redevelopment Ventures, a place-making consulting firm. Biederman has been cited for his success in using private funding to revitalize urban public spaces.

== Bryant Park Corporation ==
In 1980 Biederman and Andrew Heiskell, then chairman of Time Inc. and the New York Public Library, co-founded the Bryant Park Corporation (BPC). The not-for-profit private management company was created by the Rockefeller Brothers Fund to bring improvements to Bryant Park, a 9.6-acre (3.9 ha) park in Midtown Manhattan.

In 1987, the City of New York signed a 15-year agreement with BPC to manage, program, and improve the park, whereupon it was closed for a four-year renovation. The project entailed improving existing, and creating additional, park entrances to increase visibility from the street, enhancing the formal French garden design, and improving the park's paths and lighting. BPC's plan also included restoring the park's monuments, renovating its long-closed restrooms, and building two restaurant pavilions and four permanent food kiosks.

After a four-year effort, the park reopened in 1992. The renovation was also lauded as "the best example of urban renewal" by New York magazine, and was described by Time as a "small miracle". Many awards followed, including a Design Merit Award from Landscape Architecture magazine, and a 1996 Award for Excellence from the Urban Land Institute.

== 34th Street Partnership ==
34th Street Partnership (34SP) was founded in 1989 when then-mayor David Dinkins and property owners on 34th Street asked Biederman to spearhead efforts to improve the area adjacent to Madison Square Garden in preparation for the 1992 Democratic National Convention.

In January 1992, the partnership opened a $6 million annual program of security, sanitation, tourist information, public events, and debt service on a major capital improvement bond of $25 million for improvements to the district's streets, sidewalks, and plazas.

As president of 34SP, Biederman has criticized the condition of New York's streetscape and has led efforts to upgrade it.

The BID's design and capital departments have greatly reduced the number of individual newsboxes in the district, and convinced publishers to place their publications in 34SP's own multiple newsboxes.

== Grand Central Partnership ==
In 1984 then-mayor Ed Koch, at the behest of executives from many of the Fortune 500 companies headquartered near Grand Central Terminal in New York, asked Biederman to help make the downtrodden area around the terminal commensurate with the offices nearby. Biederman formed the Grand Central Partnership (GCP), a business improvement district that provided enhanced security, sanitation, and streetscape improvements to the area.

After a series of disagreements with then-mayor Rudy Giuliani over rules governing BIDs, Biederman resigned from GCP in 1998. He continues to serve as president of Bryant Park Corporation and 34th Street Partnership.

== Biederman Redevelopment Ventures ==
Biederman Redevelopment Ventures (BRV) specializes in creating and operating redevelopment projects in the public realm.
