= Bust of Johann Wolfgang von Goethe (New York City) =

Sculpture of Johann Wolfgang von Goethe by Karl Fischer in New York City, U.S.

Johann Wolfgang von Goethe
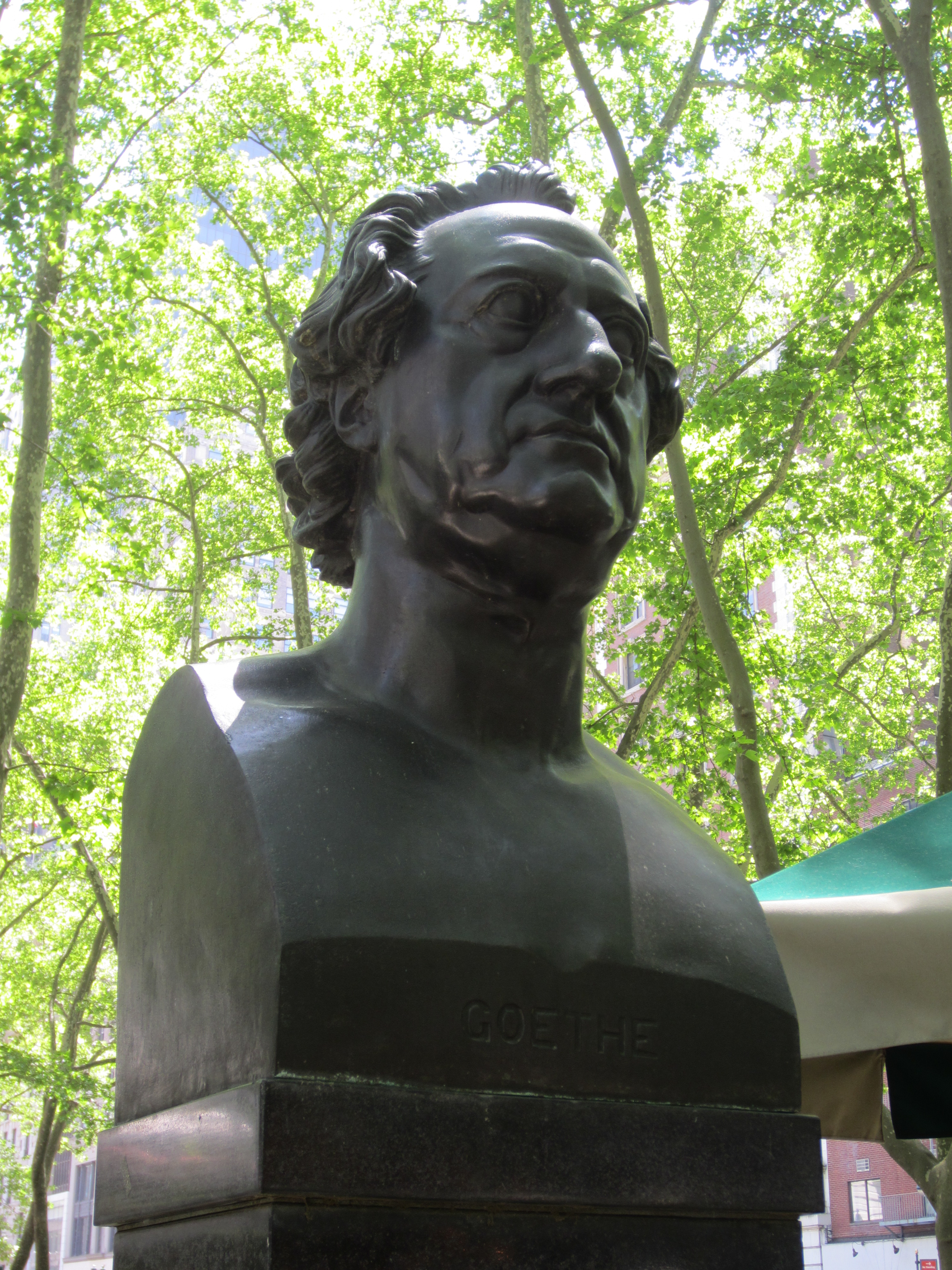
- The sculpture in 2014
- Artist: Karl Fischer
- Year: 1832 (original); 1932 (replica)
- Type: Sculpture
- Medium: Bronze
- Subject: Johann Wolfgang von Goethe
- Location: New York City, New York, United States; 40°45′12.2″N 73°59′1.7″W

An outdoor bronze portrait bust of German writer Johann Wolfgang von Goethe by sculptor Karl Fischer is installed on the south side of Bryant Park in Manhattan, New York. It is a replica of an iron and copper bust created by Fischer around 1832, the year of Goethe's death. Acquired by the Goethe Society of America in 1987, it was displayed at the Metropolitan Museum of Art until it was relocated to Bryant Park in 1932. Following its installation there, the iron and copper bust was replaced with a bronze casting and dedicated on February 15, 1932. The sculpture was refurbished in 1992 by the Bryant Park Restoration Corporation. The sculpture sits on a Swedish black granite pedestal.
