= Statue of William E. Dodge =

Statue by John Quincy Adams Ward in Manhattan, New York, USA

William Earl Dodge
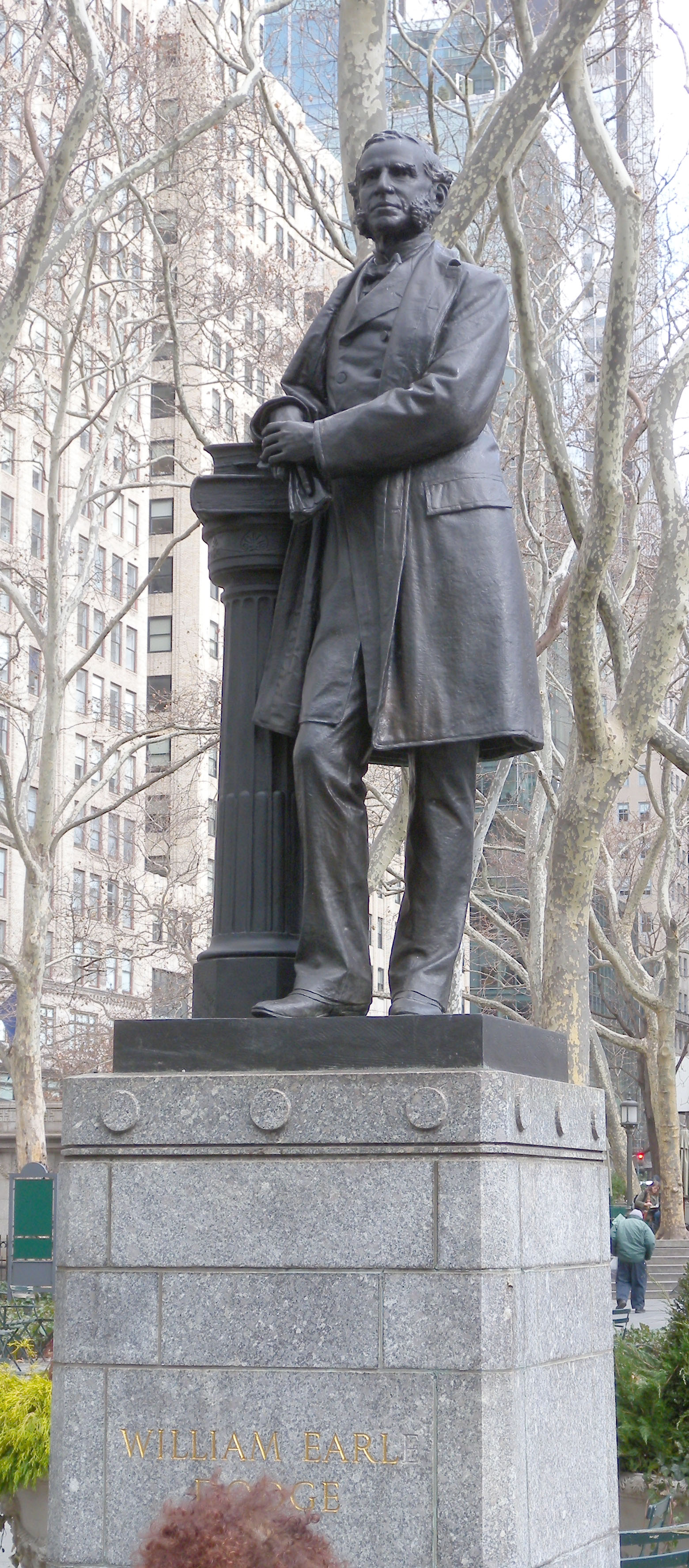
- The sculpture in 2010
- Artist: John Quincy Adams Ward
- Medium: Bronze sculpture
- Subject: William E. Dodge
- Location: New York City, United States; 40.75409°N 73.98330°W

William Earl Dodge is an outdoor bronze sculpture of William E. Dodge by John Quincy Adams Ward, located at Bryant Park in Manhattan, New York. It was cast in 1885 and dedicated on October 22 of that year.

== History ==
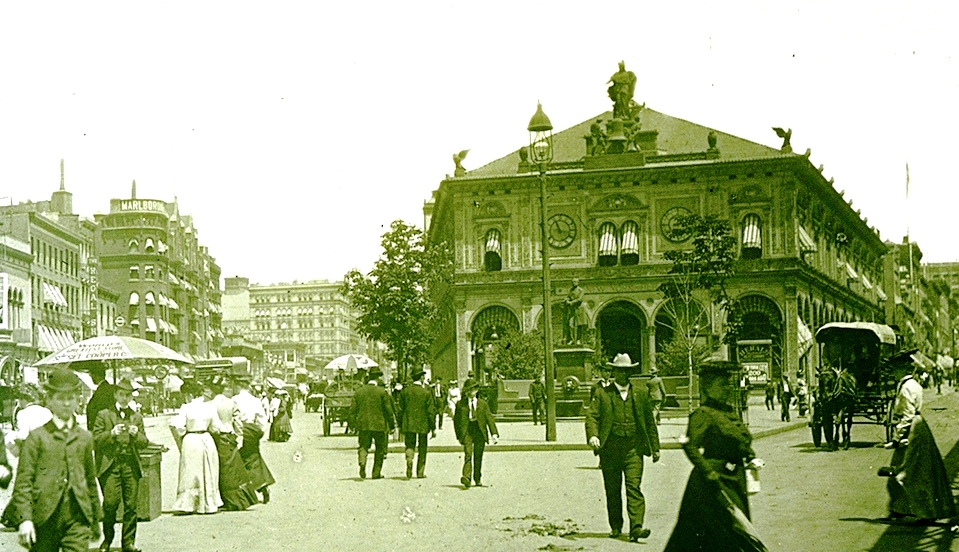
The statue in its original location in Herald Square, 1895

The statue was initially installed in Herald Square, having been financed by Dodge's admirers and friends. It was moved to Bryant Park in 1941 and was renovated in 1992 by the Bryant Park Restoration Corporation. The pedestal on which it originally stood was replaced in the 1941 move.
