= Josephine Shaw Lowell Memorial Fountain =

Fountain in Manhattan, New York, U.S.

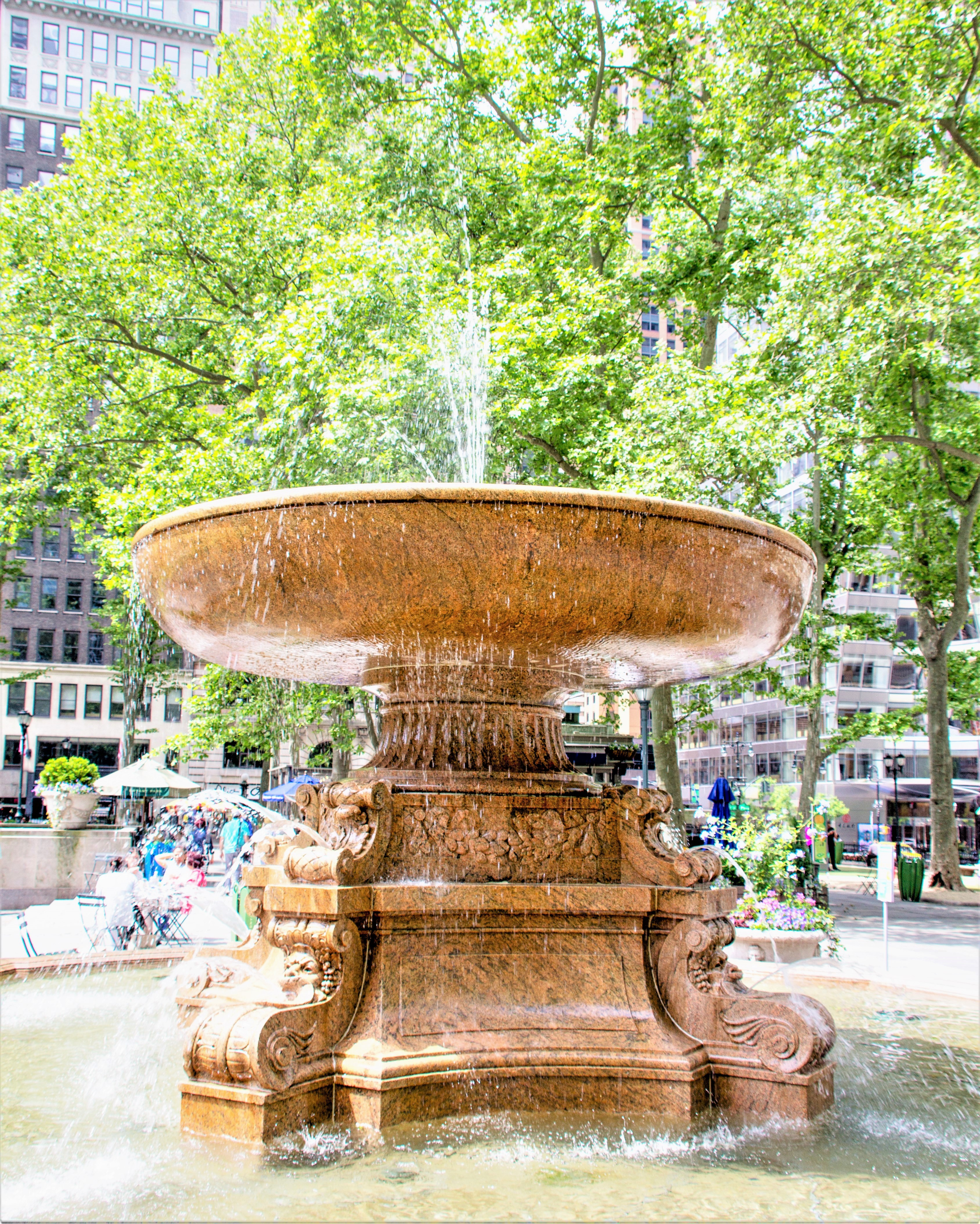
- Artist: Charles A. Platt
- Year: 21 May 1912
- Type: Black granite; bronze
- Dimensions: 9.75 m (32.0 ft)
- Location: New York City, New York, United States; 40°45′14″N 73°59′03″W

The Josephine Shaw Lowell Memorial Fountain is an outdoor fountain in Bryant Park, Manhattan, New York memorializing Josephine Shaw Lowell, a social worker active in the late 19th century. The fountain was designed by architect Charles A. Platt and dedicated in 1912.

== Description and history ==
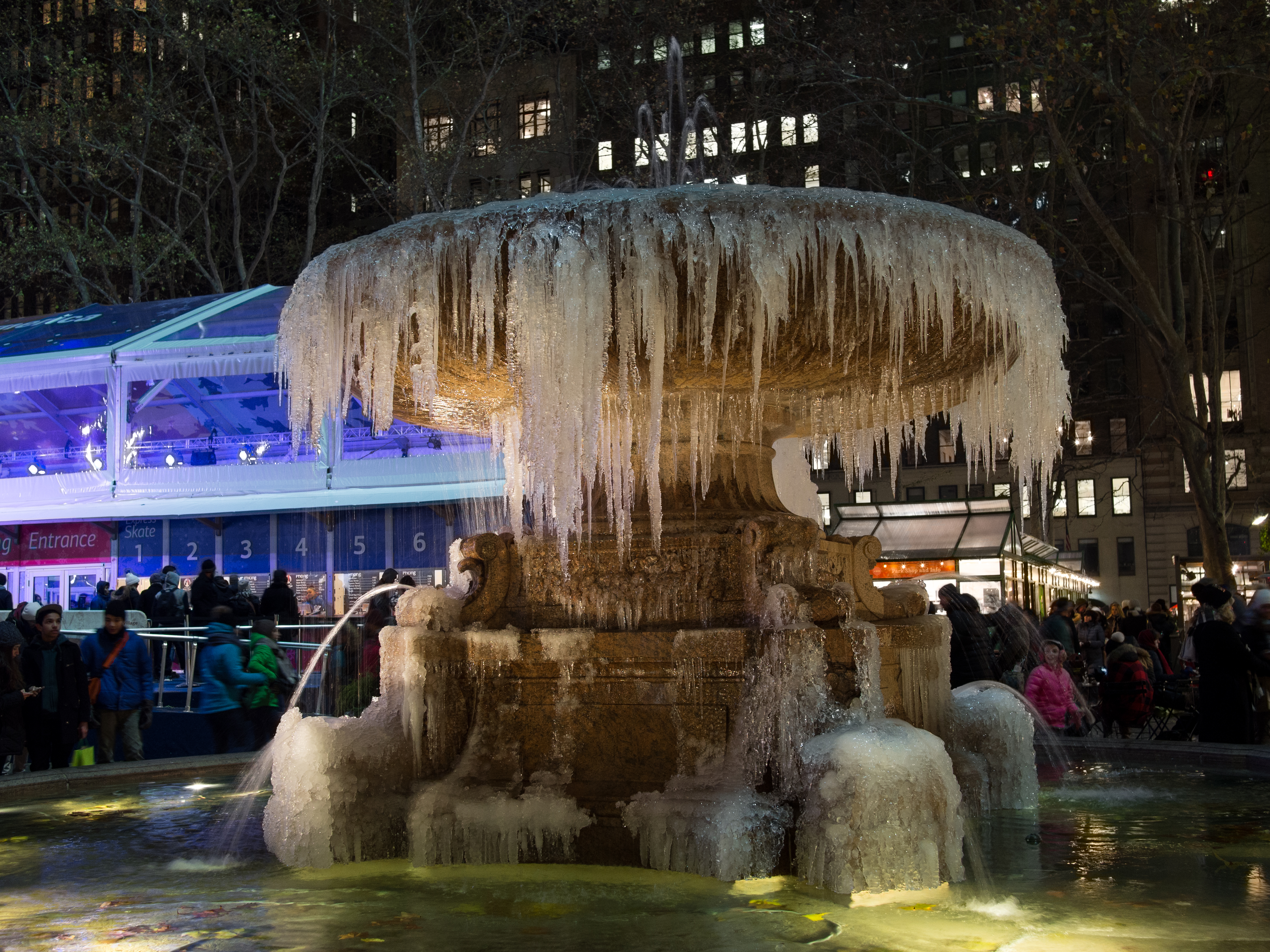
Frozen fountain in December 2016

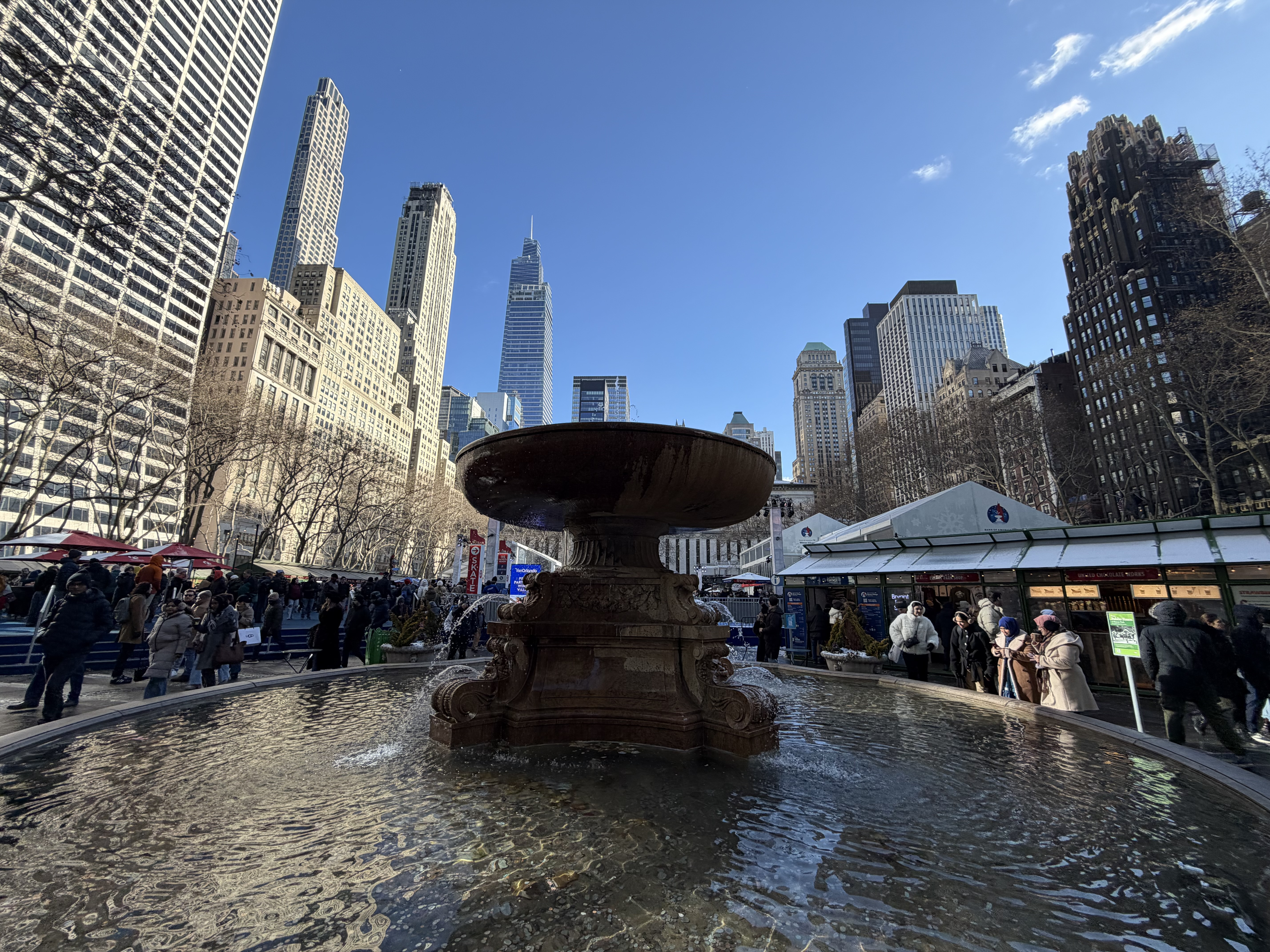
Fountain barely running in January 2026

The black granite memorial commemorates social worker Josephine Shaw Lowell, who founded the Charity Organization Society. According to the New York City Department of Parks and Recreation, Shaw was the first female member of the New York State Board of Charities; the fountain marks the "first woman to be honored by a major monument" in the city. It is made of Stony Creek granite and bronze. The fountain was dedicated on May 21, 1912, and installed at the east side of Bryant Park in 1913. It was relocated to the west side of the park in 1936.

In 2009 the fountain was winterized with the installation of an internal electric heating system, enabling it to be left on in subzero temperatures and gather icicles. The fountain is switched off during extended cold spells to prevent enough ice gathering to cause structural damage.

== See also ==
- 1912 in art
