= Bryant Park =

Public park in Manhattan, New York

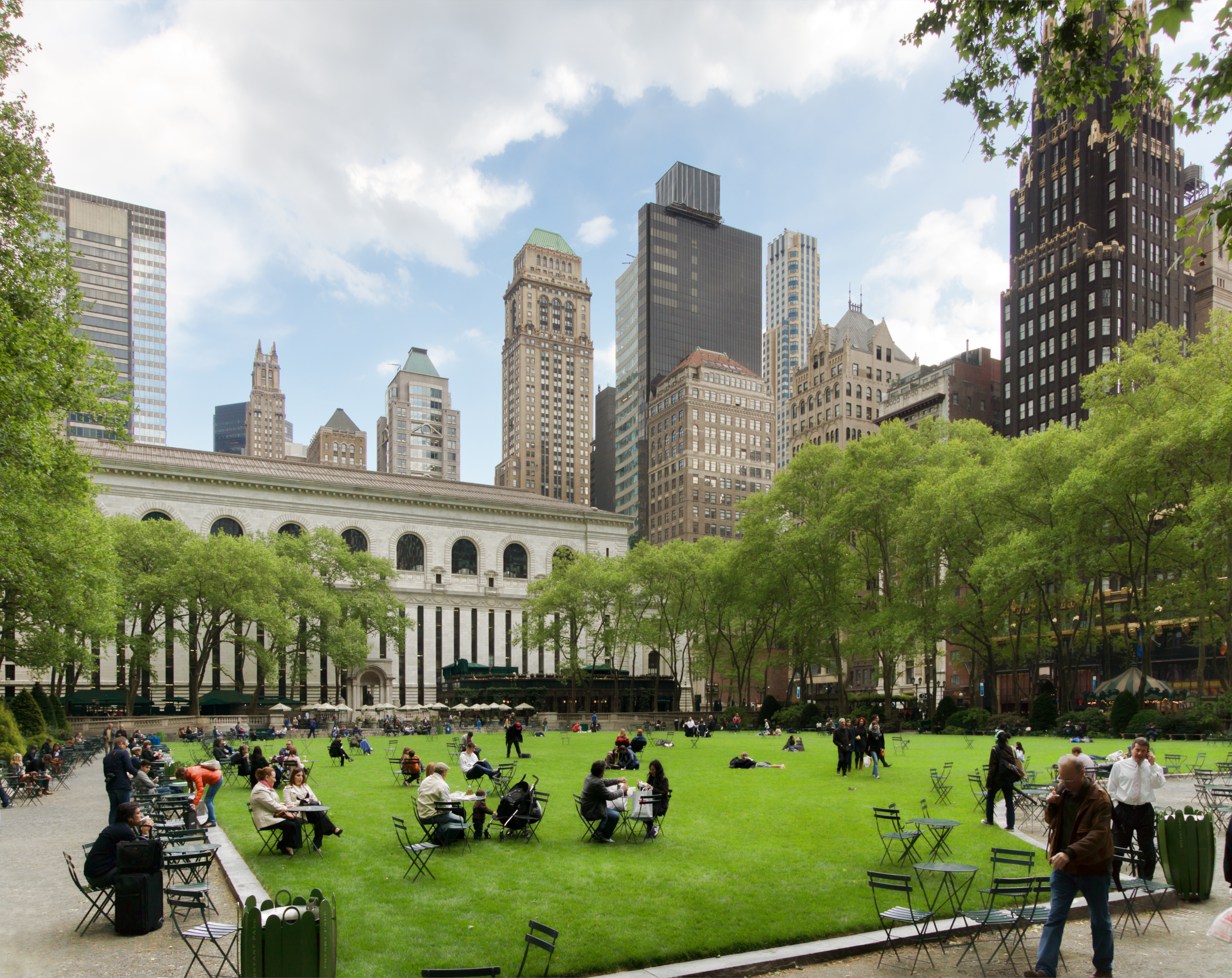
- Bryant Park with New York Public Library Main Branch in the background in April 2012
- Interactive map of Bryant Park
- Type: Public park
- Location: between Fifth and Sixth Avenues and between 40th and 42nd Streets in Midtown Manhattan, New York City
- Coordinates: 40°45′14″N 73°59′02″W
- Area: 9.6 acres (3.9 ha)
- Created: 1847
- Designer: Carrère and Hastings, Lusby Simpson
- Etymology: Named for William Cullen Bryant
- Owner: New York City Department of Parks and Recreation
- Operator: Bryant Park Corporation
- Status: Open all year
- Awards: Design Merit Award from Landscape Architecture Magazine; Urban Land Institute Award for Excellence (1996)
- Public transit: Subway: at 42nd Street–Bryant Park/Fifth Avenue; Bus: M1, M2, M3, M4, M5, M7, M42, M55, Q32
- Website: www.bryantpark.org
- New York Public Library and Bryant Park
- U.S. National Register of Historic Places
- New York State Register of Historic Places
- New York City Landmark
- Location: Avenue of the Americas, 5th Ave., 40th and 42nd Sts., New York, New York
- Coordinates: 40°45′12″N 73°58′56″W
- Built: 1895
- Architects: Carrere & Hastings; Simpson, Lusby
- Architectural style: Beaux Arts
- NRHP reference No.: 66000547
- NYSRHP No.: 06101.000613

Significant dates
- Added to NRHP: October 15, 1966
- Designated NYSRHP: June 23, 1980
- Designated NYCL: November 12, 1974

Bryant Park is a 9.6-acre (3.9 ha), privately managed public park in the New York City borough of Manhattan. It is located between Fifth Avenue and Avenue of the Americas (Sixth Avenue) and between 40th and 42nd Streets in Midtown Manhattan. The eastern half of Bryant Park is occupied by the Main Branch of the New York Public Library. The western half contains a lawn, shaded walkways, and amenities such as a carousel, and is located entirely over an underground structure that houses the library's stacks. The park hosts several events, including a seasonal "Winter Village" with an ice rink and shops during the winter.

The first park at the site was opened in 1847 and was called Reservoir Square due to its proximity to the Croton Distributing Reservoir. Reservoir Square contained the New York Crystal Palace, which hosted the Exhibition of the Industry of All Nations in 1853 and burned down in 1858. The square was renamed in 1884 for abolitionist and journalist William Cullen Bryant. The reservoir was demolished in 1900 and the New York Public Library's main branch was built on the site, opening in 1911. Bryant Park was rebuilt in 1933–1934 to a plan by Lusby Simpson. After a period of decline, it was restored in 1988–1992 by landscape architects Hanna/Olin Ltd. and architects Hardy Holzman Pfeiffer Associates, during which the park was rebuilt and the library's stacks were built underneath. Further improvements were made in the late 20th and early 21st centuries.

Though it is owned by the New York City Department of Parks and Recreation, Bryant Park is managed by the private not-for-profit organization Bryant Park Corporation, which was founded in 1980 and led the restoration of Bryant Park. The park is cited as a model for the success of public-private partnerships. The park is both a National Register of Historic Places listing and a New York City designated landmark.

== History ==
=== Early history ===
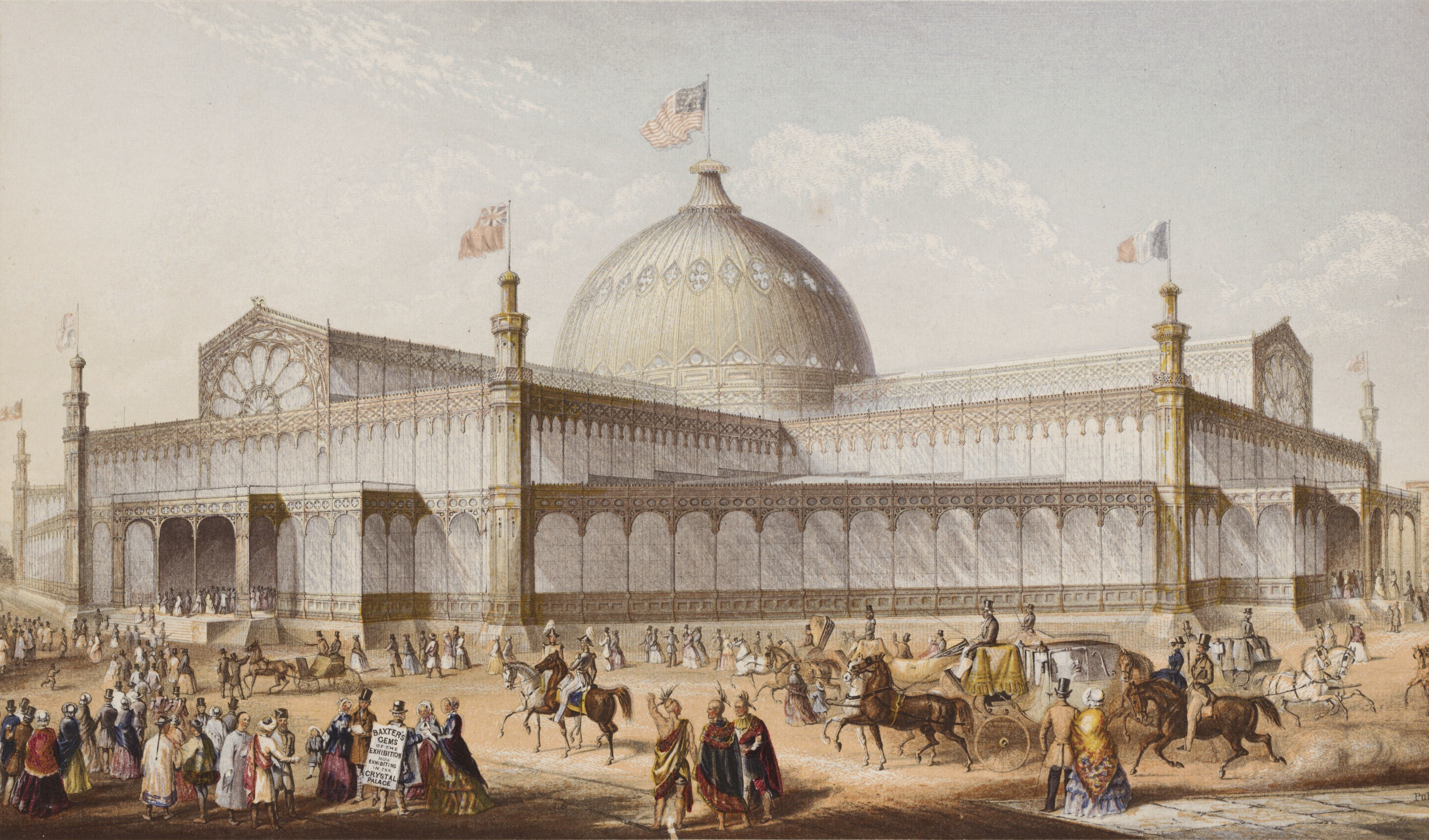
Painting of the New York Crystal Palace, 1853

In 1686, when the area was still a wilderness, New York's colonial governor, Thomas Dongan, designated the area now known as Bryant Park as a public space. George Washington's troops crossed the area while retreating from the Battle of Long Island in 1776. The road upon which Washington's troops retreated traversed the park site diagonally. The city acquired the land in 1822. Beginning in 1823, Bryant Park was designated a potter's field (a graveyard for the poor) and remained so until 1840, when thousands of bodies were moved to Wards Island.

The first park at this site opened in 1847, though that park was never legally named. It was called "Reservoir Square" after the Croton Distributing Reservoir, which was erected on the eastern side of the park site due to its elevated location. In 1853, the Exhibition of the Industry of All Nations with the New York Crystal Palace, featuring thousands of exhibitors, took place in the park. The Crystal Palace, also known as the Great Exhibition Hall, burned down in 1858. The Latting Observatory was also constructed in the park as part of the 1853 Exhibition, and was also burned down in 1856. The square was used for military drills during the American Civil War, and was the site of some of the New York City draft riots of July 1863, when the Colored Orphan Asylum at Fifth Avenue and 43rd Street was burned down.

Reservoir Square was renovated in 1870–1871, during which the modern-day park had been laid out. Several additional structures were planned for Reservoir Square, but never built. These included an 1870 plan for new armory for the 7th New York Militia, an 1880 plan for an opera house, another plan in 1881 for a New York Historical Society building, an 1893 plan for relocating the New York City Hall building, and a 1903 plan for a general post office.

=== Late 19th and early 20th centuries ===
==== Renaming and library construction ====
A clip of Panorama from the Times Building, New York 1905, Bryant Park (and NYPL under construction) and Hippodrome Theater (demolished in the 1930s and now The Hippodrome building)

In 1884, Reservoir Square was renamed Bryant Park, to honor the New York Evening Post editor and abolitionist William Cullen Bryant. Around the same time as the park's renaming, in 1883, plans emerged to build a library in Bryant Park, atop the site of the reservoir. The library would be funded by Samuel J. Tilden. This was opposed somewhat by property owners, who wanted to extend the park eastward onto the reservoir site. Nevertheless, by the 1890s, the reservoir was slated for demolition. When the New York Public Library was founded in 1895, its founders wanted an imposing main branch building. The trustees of the libraries chose to build the branch at the eastern end of Bryant Park, along Fifth Avenue between 40th and 42nd Streets, because it was centrally located between the Astor and Lenox Libraries, the library's direct predecessors. The architects of the building, Carrère and Hastings, also planned to convert the western border along Sixth Avenue into a pedestrian arcade with a flower market, while the central portion of Bryant Park would have housed sculptures and statues. However, these plans were cancelled as a result of opposition.

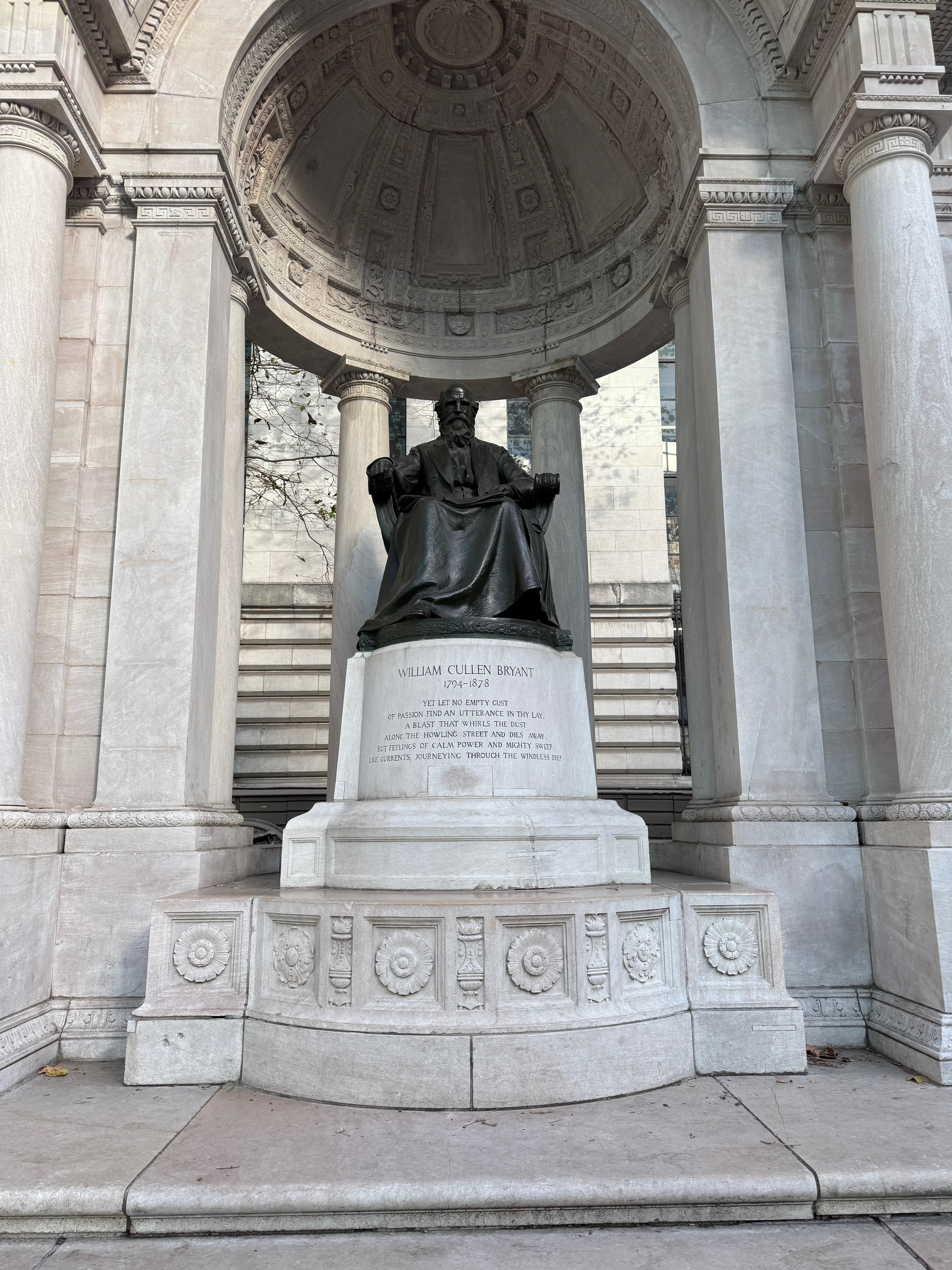
The William Cullen Bryant Memorial, installed 1911, includes a bronze statue of William Cullen Bryant, the park's namesake

The reservoir was torn down by 1900, and construction started on the library. In conjunction with the library's construction, several improvements were made to the park, such as terrace gardens, public facilities, and kiosks, as well as a raised terrace adjoining the library on the eastern portion of the park. Since Bryant Park itself was located several feet above the surrounding streets, an iron fence, hedge, and embankment wall were built on the north, west, and south borders to separate the park from the bordering sidewalks. Benches were also installed along the retaining walls. Bryant Park's interior was split into three lawns, divided by a pair of west–east gravel paths that aligned roughly with the sidewalks of 41st Street on the west end of the park. Four stone stairways were built: one each from Sixth Avenue's intersections with 40th and 42nd Streets, and one each from 40th and 42nd Streets between Fifth and Sixth Avenues. In addition, 42nd Street was widened in 1910, necessitating the relocation of the fence on Bryant Park's northern border and the removal of plants there. The NYPL's Main Branch was opened on May 23, 1911.

==== Infrastructure and further improvements ====
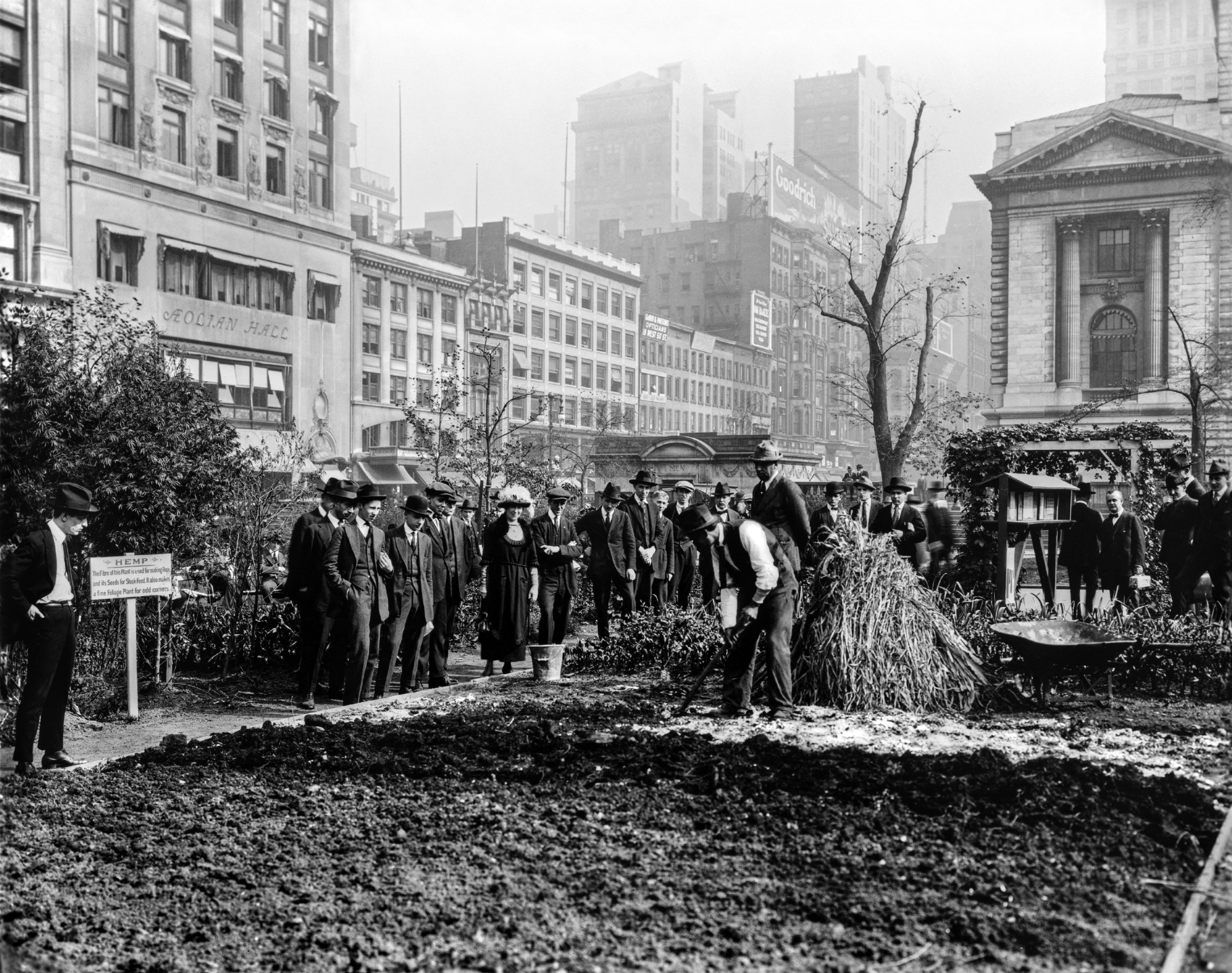
Experimental garden in Bryant Park, 1922

Due to its central location in Midtown Manhattan, several transit lines and infrastructure projects were also built around Bryant Park. The first of these was the Sixth Avenue Elevated railway, which opened in 1878. The city's first subway line, now part of the 42nd Street Shuttle, was opened in 1904 by the Interborough Rapid Transit Company (IRT) and ran directly under 42nd Street. In the 1910s, the Hudson & Manhattan Railroad (now PATH) also planned to extend their Uptown Hudson Tubes from Herald Square to Grand Central Terminal, with intermediate stations near Bryant Park's northeast and southwest corners, though this plan was never realized.

The Catskill Aqueduct water tunnel was built under Bryant Park in the early 1910s. Once the work was complete, the affected sections of Bryant Park were restored. During World War I, Bryant Park was frequently used for patriotic rallies, and a "war garden" and a "recreation building" for Allied soldiers was erected in the park. After the end of the war in 1920, an experimental garden was placed in the park and the recreation building was destroyed. During construction of the IRT Flushing Line in the 1920s, the northern segment of Bryant Park was partly closed for four years while the subway line was constructed directly underneath. The subway tunnel ran 35 feet (11 m) below ground level with a station at the eastern edge of the park, at Fifth Avenue and 42nd Street. During construction, workers took precautions to avoid interrupting the flow of traffic above ground and interfering with preexisting tunnels. The Fifth Avenue station opened in 1926, while the tunnel under Bryant Park to Times Square opened the following year. In January 1927, after the section of the Flushing Line under Bryant Park was complete, plans were announced for a restoration of the park's northern section.

=== 1930s restoration ===
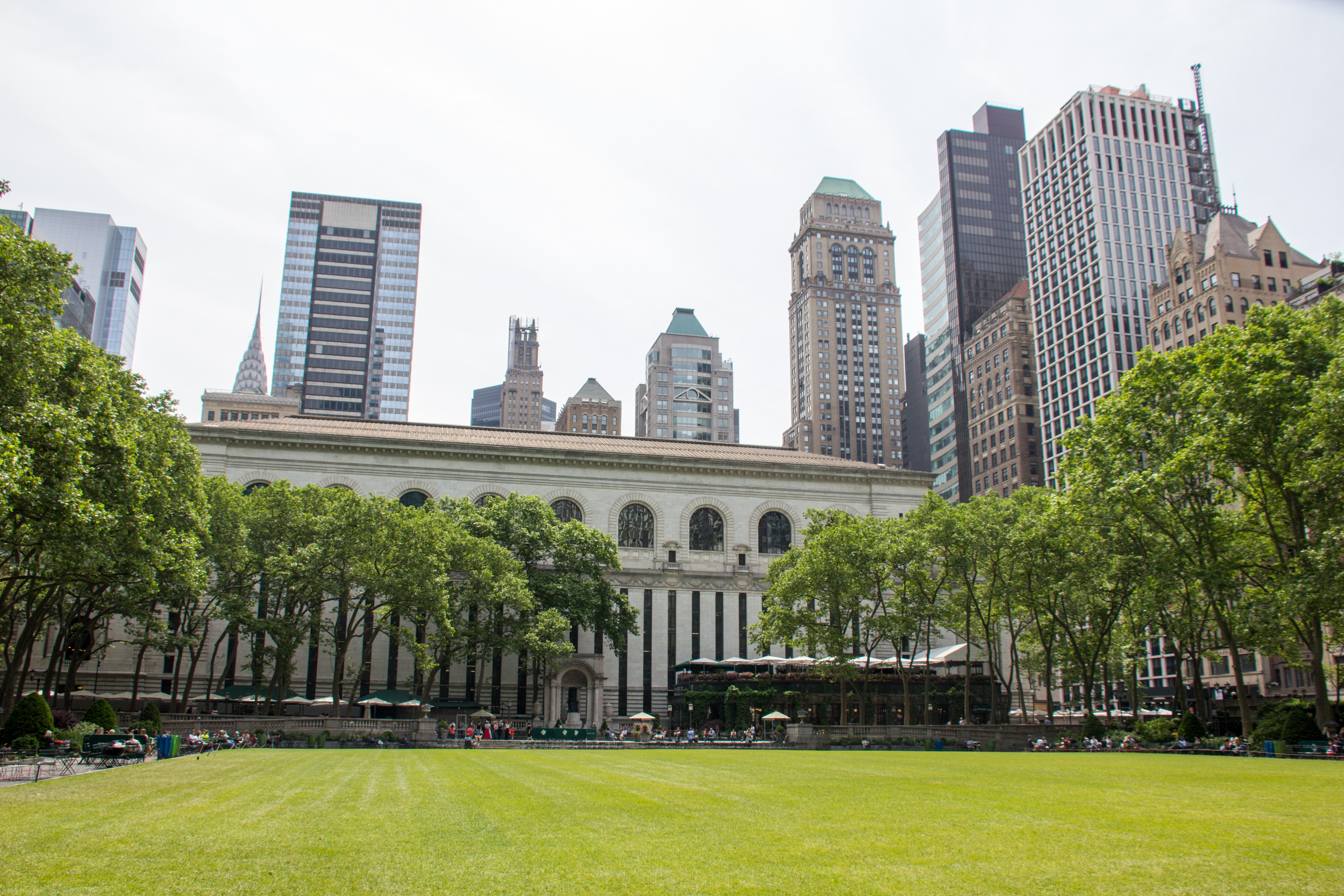
Looking east

By the 1930s, Bryant Park was suffering from neglect and was considered disreputable, as the Sixth Avenue elevated literally overshadowed the park. Over a period of 10 years, about 100 separate plans for Bryant Park's renovation were proposed, but never enacted. In an attempt to revitalize the park, the George Washington Bicentennial Planning Committee and Sears filed plans for a replica of Lower Manhattan's Federal Hall in early 1932. During the construction of the replica, part of the park was fenced off. The Dr. Marion Sims and Washington Irving statues were removed; the statues were later found under the Williamsburg Bridge. The replica was opened to the public in May 1932, charging an admission fee for entry. That November, Manhattan parks commissioner Walter R. Herrick formally notified Sears that the replica had to be torn down, because he did not approve of its proposed conversion into a Great Depression relief center. By the next year, the Bicentennial Committee's funds had been exhausted. The replica was torn down in mid-1933.

In an attempt to engage unemployed architects, the Architects' Emergency Committee held a competition for the redesign of Bryant Park in 1933. The winning design was submitted by Lusby Simpson, of Queens. However, due to a lack of funding, the winning design was not implemented immediately. In February 1934, under the leadership of newly appointed parks commissioner Robert Moses, work was started on Simpson's plan. The renovated park featured a great lawn, as well as hedges and later an iron fence that separated the park from the surrounding city streets. Two entrances each were added from 40th and 42nd Streets. As part of the project, 270 trees were placed around the park. Moses also placed the park's statues along 40th and 42nd Streets so as to block sight lines from these streets. To save money, the project hired workers from the Civil Works Administration, an unemployment relief program. The renovation was complete by late 1934, and after a short postponement, the park reopened that September 15.

Parts of the park were closed in the late 1930s due to transit changes on Sixth Avenue; the elevated was torn down in 1938, and the construction of the underground Sixth Avenue subway line occurred around the same time. The Sixth Avenue subway opened in 1940. A New Yorker article remarked in 1936 that during the prior 14 years, "Bryant Park has been closed to the public [...] for half that time."

=== Mid-20th century ===
Public events in Bryant Park were held through the mid-20th century. For instance, in 1944 during World War II, an aircraft demonstration was held in the park. Outdoor summer concerts in Bryant Park were started in 1948 by Philip Lieson Miller, a musicologist at the New York Public Library. These concerts took place from 12 to 2 p.m. on weekdays from July through September. On October 15, 1969, forty thousand people attended a rally in Bryant Park as part of the nationwide Moratorium to End the War in Vietnam. Another large event, the Big Apple Circus, was proposed to be held in Bryant Park in 1978, but parks commissioner Gordon Davis denied the circus permission to host a show there, since it would have closed off Bryant Park to the public.

Plans to build parking garages under Bryant Park also surfaced in the mid-20th century, as a means of relieving parking shortages in Midtown Manhattan. The first such plan was made in 1946 when the city conducted a survey to determine the feasibility of such a garage. Parks commissioner Moses opposed the plan. A parking garage was proposed again in 1958, with plans for 1,200 spaces, though Moses also opposed this proposal. This proposal was backed by the Avenue of the Americas Association. However, though Mayor Robert F. Wagner Jr. supported the proposal, the New York City Planning Commission voted against it in November 1961.

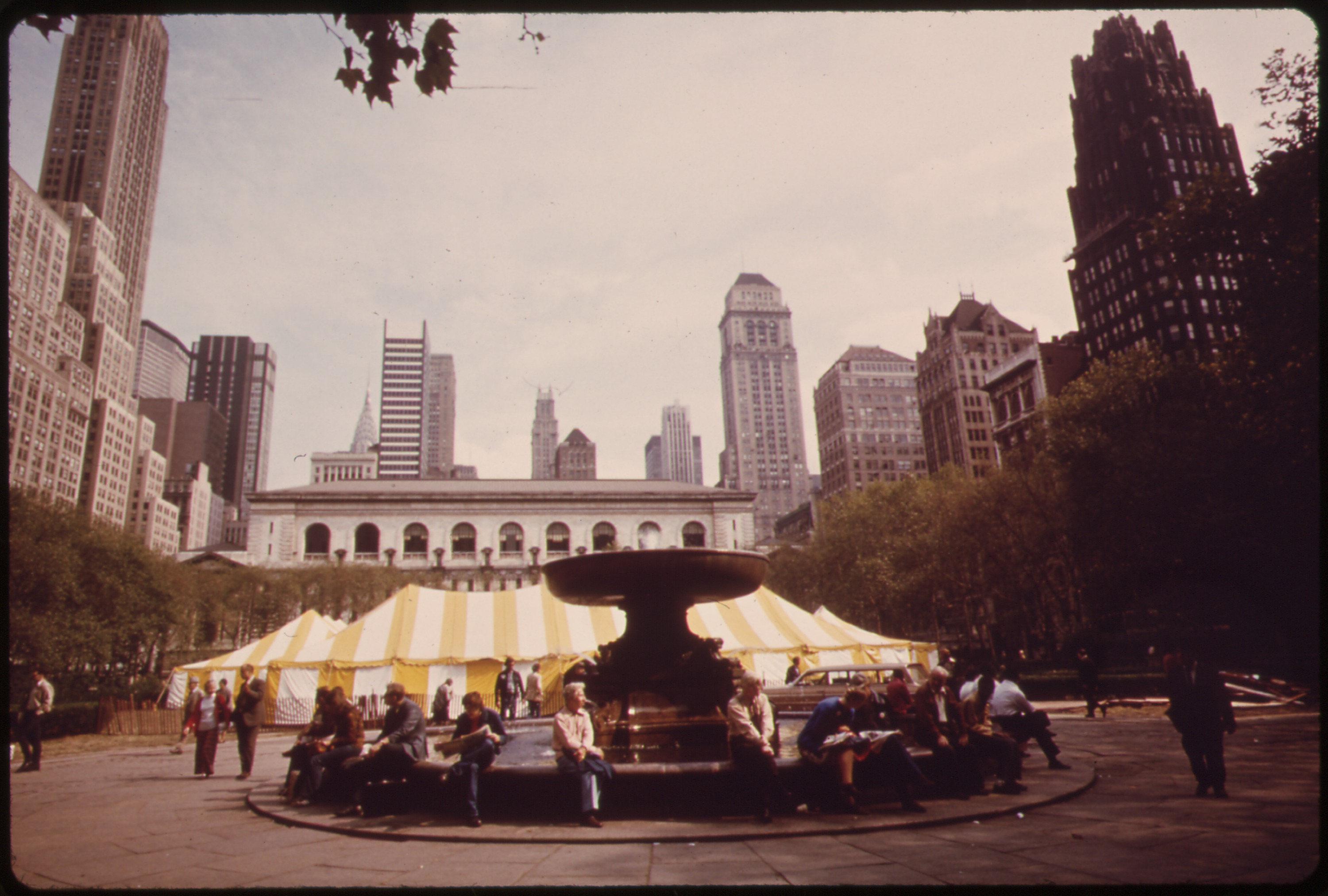
The park in 1973

By the 1960s, Bryant Park had entered a state of deterioration, due to a lack of maintenance and its location in a business district with few nighttime activities. In an attempt to deter crime, new lighting was installed in Bryant Park in 1962. Nevertheless, in 1966, parks commissioner Thomas Hoving called a meeting to restore the park, noting its degraded condition. By the 1970s, Bryant Park had been taken over by drug dealers and the homeless, and was considered a no-go area by ordinary citizens and visitors. The condition of the park was so bad that in 1973, parks commissioner Richard M. Clurman threatened to "close Bryant Park and clear it of everybody—until we can get together and make it a place that New Yorkers want it to be." After a man was murdered at the park in 1976, the New York Times noted that gambling and drinking were commonplace at the park. In an opinion piece in the New York Daily News, Jerome Gartner, a coordinator for the Bryant Park Steering Committee, stated that the mugging of a Union Carbide executive in Bryant Park had been quoted as a reason for the company's moving out of New York City.

An initial attempt at cleanup was commenced by the Bryant Park Community Fund in the mid-1970s. Free concerts were added in the hope that it would keep out criminals. The initiative was largely unsuccessful, though, and its funding was nearly depleted by 1977. Another initiative, the Bryant Park Steering Committee, was created in 1977 as a partnership between local businesses and the City University of New York. More New York City Police Department (NYPD) officers were added, and District Attorney Robert Morgenthau agreed to process arrests in Bryant Park more quickly. By 1978, public perception of Bryant Park's safety was slightly better than in previous years, though drug dealers still frequented the park after office workers had gone back to work following their lunch breaks. Furthermore, NYPD officers initially declined to arrest drug users who were nonviolent. Starting in 1979, a coordinated program of amenities, including book and flower markets, landscape improvements, and entertainment activities, was initiated by a parks advocacy group called the Parks Council. Though the Parks Council's activities became popular, drug use and small crimes were still common within the park through the early 1980s. After a group of undercover NYPD officers were stationed in the park starting in 1980, they had made 400 drug-related arrests within six months.

=== Late 20th century ===
==== Formation of corporations ====
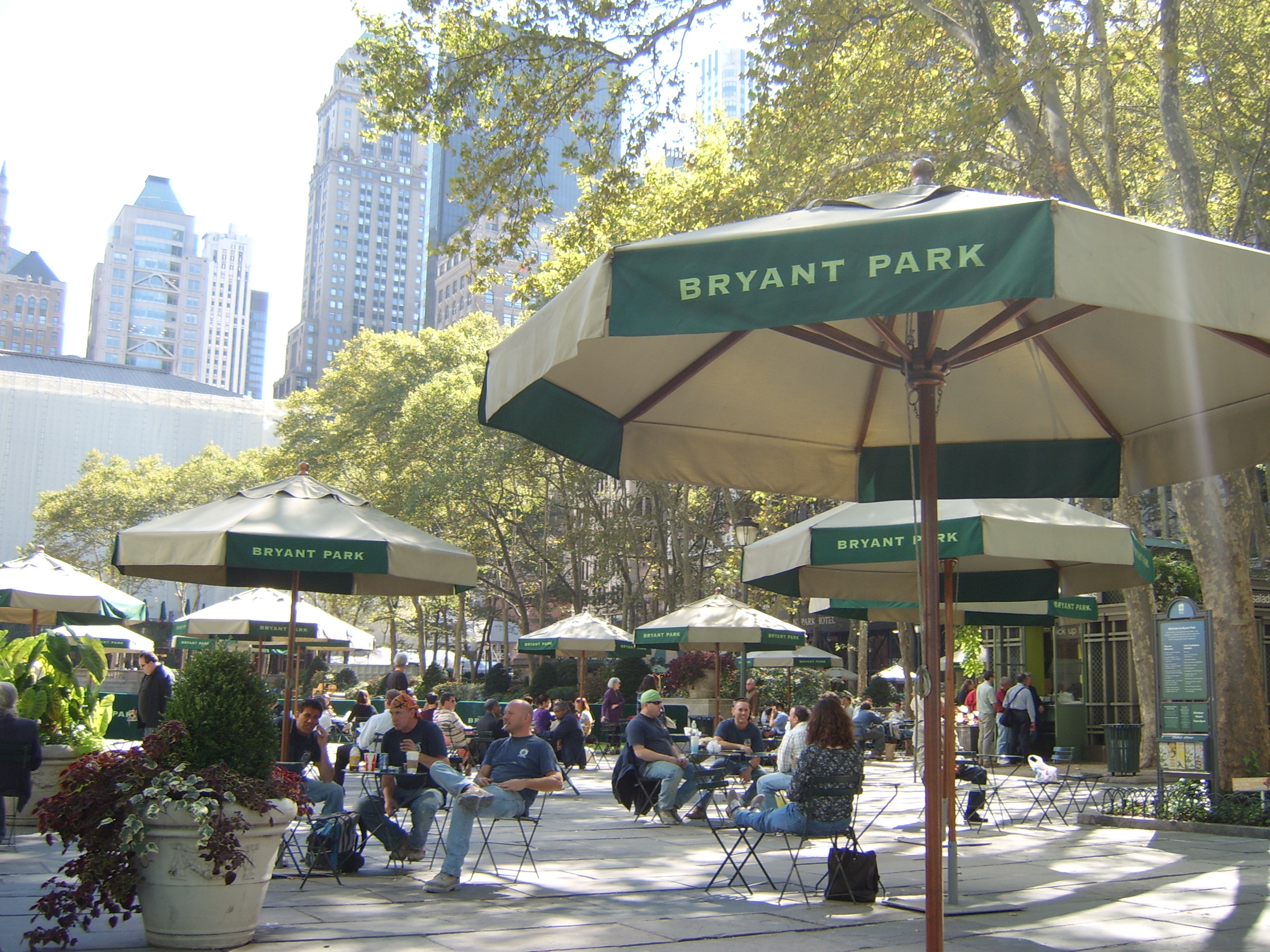
Tables and seating

The Bryant Park Restoration Corporation was founded in 1980 by Dan Biederman, along with Andrew Heiskell, chairman of Time Inc. and the New York Public Library. The BPRC immediately brought significant changes to remake the park into a place that people wanted to visit, and instituted a rigorous program to clean the park, remove graffiti, and repair physical damage. The BPRC also created a private security staff to confront unlawful behavior. In addition, the BPRC started an outdoor concert series in the summers. By 1982, arrests had decreased significantly compared to two years prior.

Another agency—the Bryant Park Management Corporation, composed of several nearby businesses—was tasked with maintaining the park, spending $525,000 per year to do so. NYC Parks spent an additional $250,000 a year on maintenance, the same amount as when the city had sole control over the park's management. In 1983, HBO's president, Frank Biondi, gave Heiskell a $100,000 check just before the company moved into new headquarters at 1100 Avenue of the Americas, adjacent to the park. At the time, that was the largest donation toward Bryant Park by a private corporation.

==== Renovation ====
In 1983, in an attempt to draw crowds to the park and raise money for continued maintenance, the BPRC proposed leasing Bryant Park from the city, renovating it, and building a café in the park. The $18 million renovation was to be executed by an alliance between the BPRC, NYPL, and NYC Parks. Restaurateur Warner LeRoy was to operate the eatery, and he planned to build an 80-foot-tall (24 m), 10,500-square-foot (980 m^{2}) glass café on the park's east side adjacent to the library. In addition, the park would include four smaller food kiosks, a reflecting pool and water fountain, and a dedicated security team.

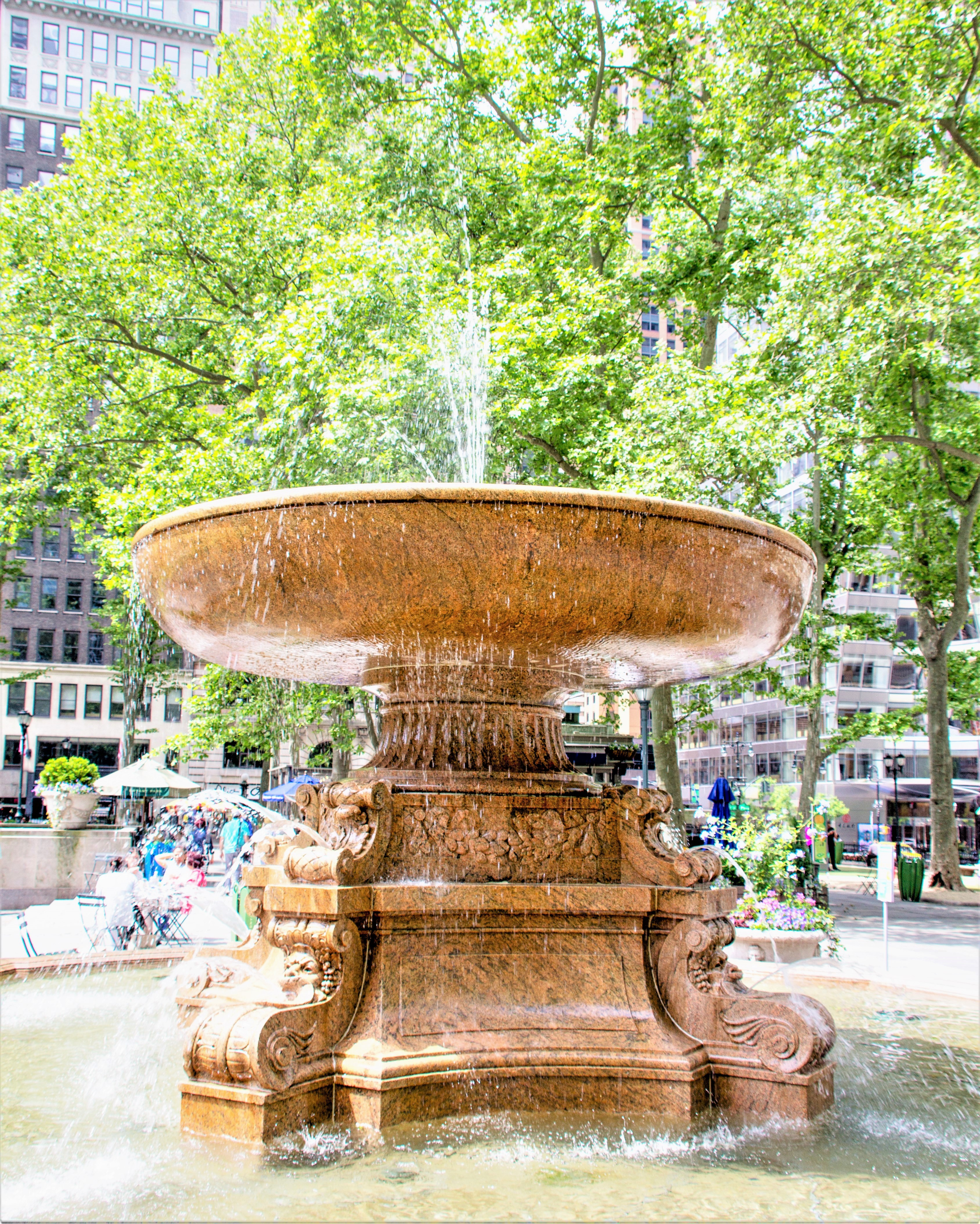
Josephine Shaw Lowell Memorial Fountain

In 1984, the state passed legislation to allow the BPRC to lease space for such an eatery. The City Planning Commission also approved the structure the following year. However, the proposed café was met with opposition from the public, as it would obscure the library's rear facade. Several park advocates who opposed it argued that the proposed eatery would turn over part of a public park to a private entity. LeRoy withdrew from the project in 1986 due to this opposition, saying that he feared that the constant reviews of the plan would bring the proposed structure to "mediocrity".

The renovation was approved by the City Art Commission in January 1987, though the restaurant plan had not yet been approved. Following LeRoy's withdrawal from the proposed Bryant Park café, the BPRC created a new plan with multiple smaller restaurant spaces. The spaces would be composed of two smaller pavilions, each 20 feet (6.1 m) tall with an area of 5,250 square feet (488 m^{2}), flanking the Bryant memorial next to the library. In September 1987, the plans went to another vote before the City Art Commission, with the New York City Landmarks Preservation Commission taking an advisory role. The redesigned restaurant spaces were also approved by the City Art Commission that December, though the New York City Landmarks Preservation Commission registered no official position on the matter. A concessionaire for one of the spaces was found in 1988, and the same year, the city turned over duties of Bryant Park's land to BPRC. Subsequently, the park redesign was drafted by Hanna/Olin Ltd. and Hardy Holzman Pfeiffer Associates; the design preserved many elements of Simpson's design in the 1930s.

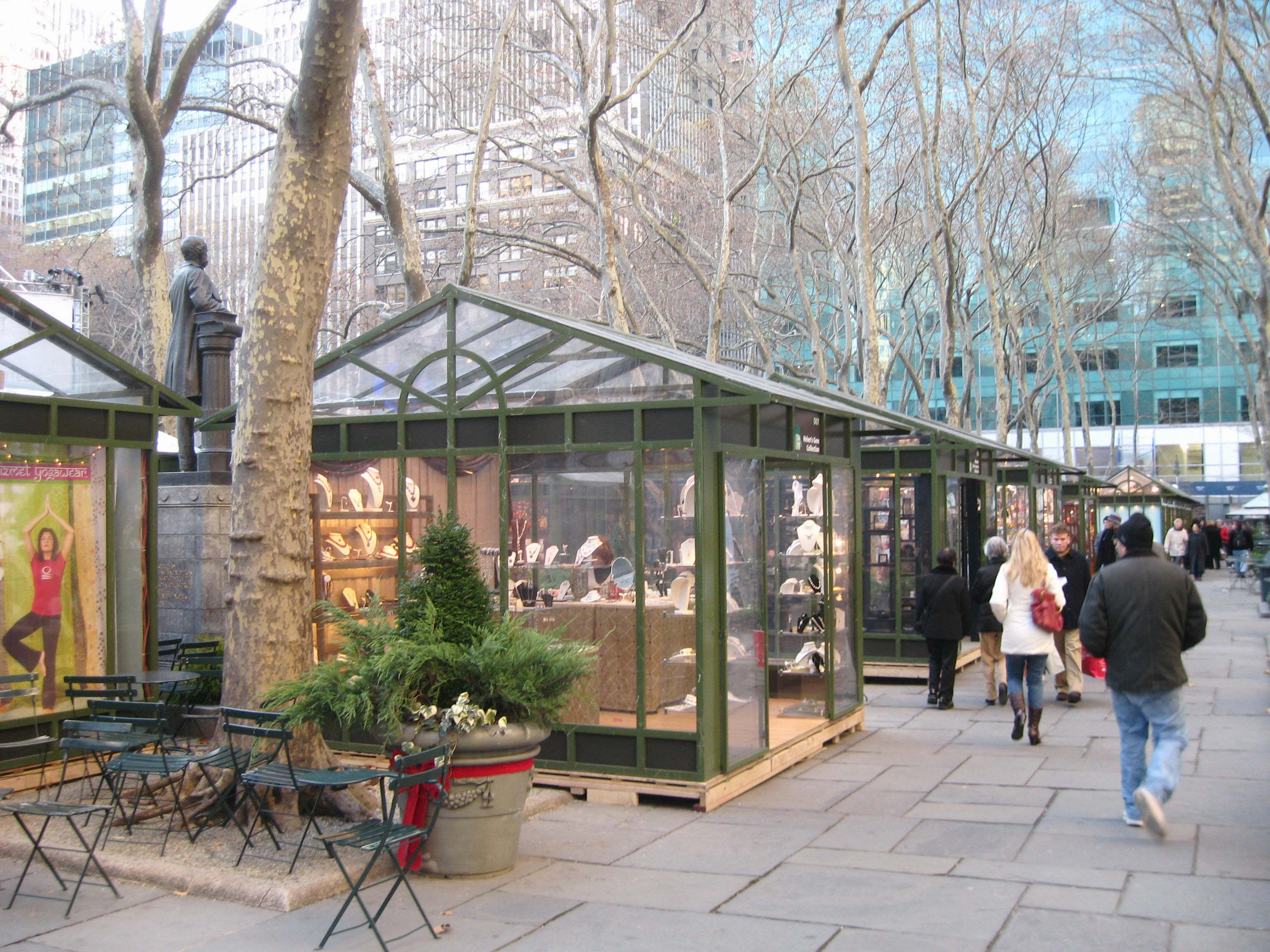
The Holiday Shops at Winter Village

The park was closed for renovations on July 11, 1988. The four-year project to rebuild Bryant Park entailed new entrances, repairs to paths and lighting, and a redesign of the park's garden by Lynden Miller. Biederman worked with William H. Whyte, a sociologist whose influence led them to implement two decisions. One was the placement of 2,000 movable chairs in the park. The other was to lower the park itself, because Bryant Park had been elevated from the street and isolated by tall hedges prior to the 1988 redesign. The 1988 renovation lowered the park to nearly street level and tore out the hedges, though much of the park was still slightly elevated. The park's restrooms, which had been closed for 35 years, were renovated as well. The BPRC also found that several of the sculptures would need to be repaired, and called on William Cullen Bryant's descendants and other entities to provide funding for the restoration of these sculptures. Landscape architect Laurie Olin of Hanna/Olin recalls that the design process focused on "the different abilities of people [who] use these spaces...as well as making spaces that people are comfortable being with each other in." The restoration cost $8.9 million, which included $5.7 million of city funding and $3.2 million of private funding.

The renovation took place at the same time as the NYPL's expansion of the main branch's stacks underneath Bryant Park. The project was originally estimated to cost $21.6 million and was to be the largest expansion project in the main branch's history; it entailed building 84 miles (135 km) of stacks, which could hold 3.2 million books. Construction on the stacks started after the park was closed. The park was excavated and the Great Lawn was rebuilt above it. Once the underground facilities were completed, Bryant Park was completely rebuilt, with 2.5 to 6 feet (0.76 to 1.83 m) of earth between the park surface and the storage facility's ceiling.

==== Reopening and critical acclaim ====
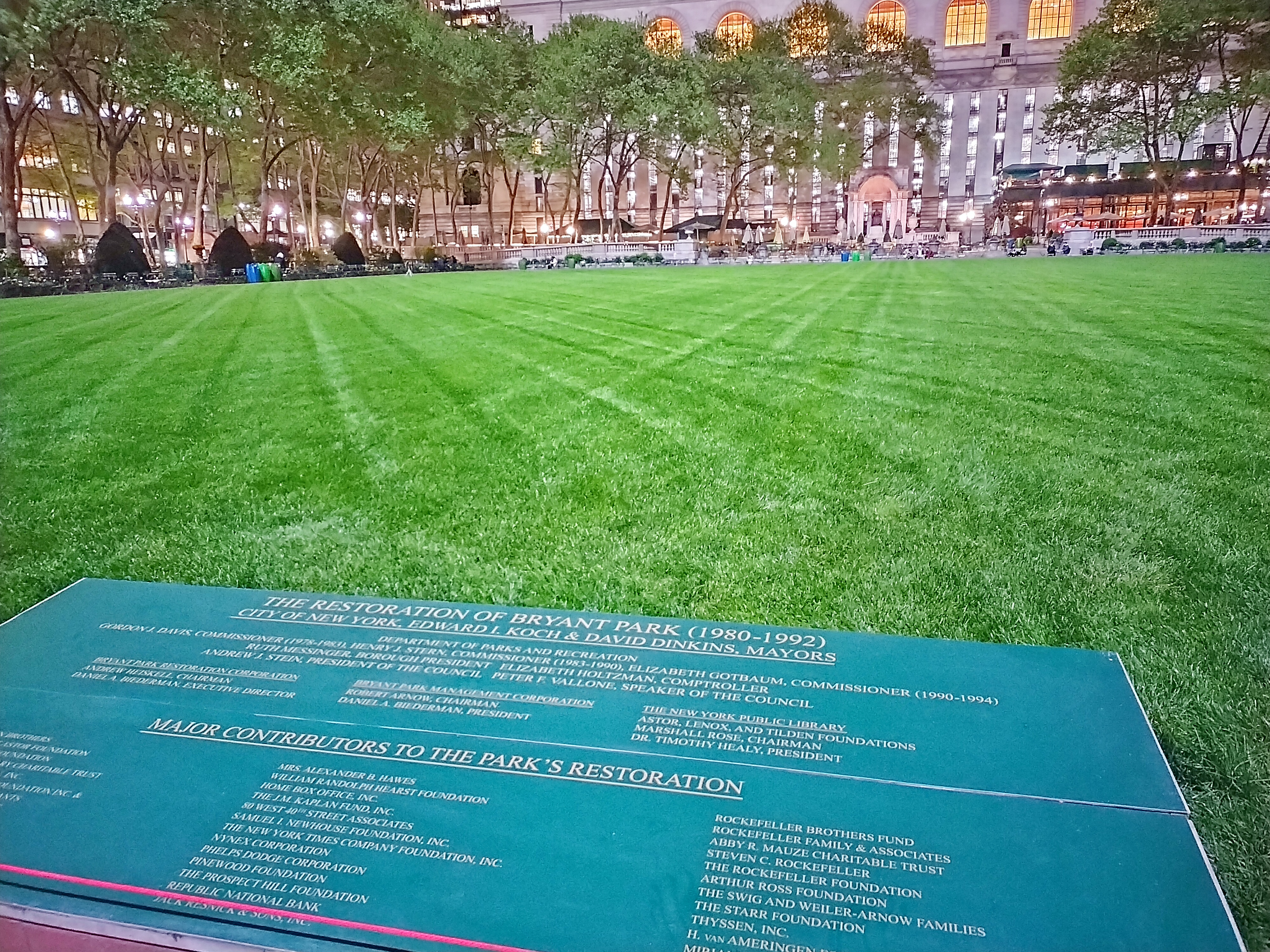
The central lawn of Bryant Park. In the foreground is an emergency-exit hatch from the stacks under the park.

Bryant Park was initially supposed to reopen in late 1990 or early 1991. The reopening date was pushed back due to delays caused by the construction of the library's stacks. In June 1991, the city and BPRC reached an agreement to reopen the western section of Bryant Park on summer weekdays. The park was soft reopened on April 21, 1992, with the official reopening set for nearly a month later.

The new design received widespread acclaim. Deemed "a triumph for many" by New York Times architectural critic Paul Goldberger, the renovation was lauded not only for its architectural excellence, but also for adhering to Whyte's vision. According to Goldberger, Biederman "understood that the problem of Bryant Park was its perception as an enclosure cut off from the city; he knew that, paradoxically, people feel safer when not cut off from the city, and that they feel safer in the kind of public space they think they have some control over." The renovation was lauded as "The Best Example of Urban Renewal" by New York magazine, and was described by Time as a "small miracle". Many awards followed, including a Design Merit Award from Landscape Architecture Magazine, and the 1996 Award for Excellence from the Urban Land Institute (ULI). The park has been extolled for its relative calmness and cleanness. Through the 21st century, Bryant Park remained a model of civic renewal that mayors of other cities, such as Jorge Elorza of Providence, Rhode Island, sometimes held up as a model to emulate.

Bryant Park was described in the media as an example of New York City's 1990s revival. A New York Times article in 1995 referred to the park as the "Town Square of Midtown" and an "office oasis" frequented by midtown office workers. Further improvements included the installation of two newsstands in 1992, one each at Fifth and Sixth Avenues. Open-air concerts in the summers, which drew thousands of people, were commenced. To lessen infestations of pigeons eating the plants, the BPC started scattering corn kernels that contained the drug azacosterol, which resulted in many pigeons becoming infertile without any other side effects. Meanwhile, financing for a restaurant in Bryant Park next to the library was finally secured in 1993. The restaurant, Bryant Park Grill, opened in 1995.

=== 21st century ===
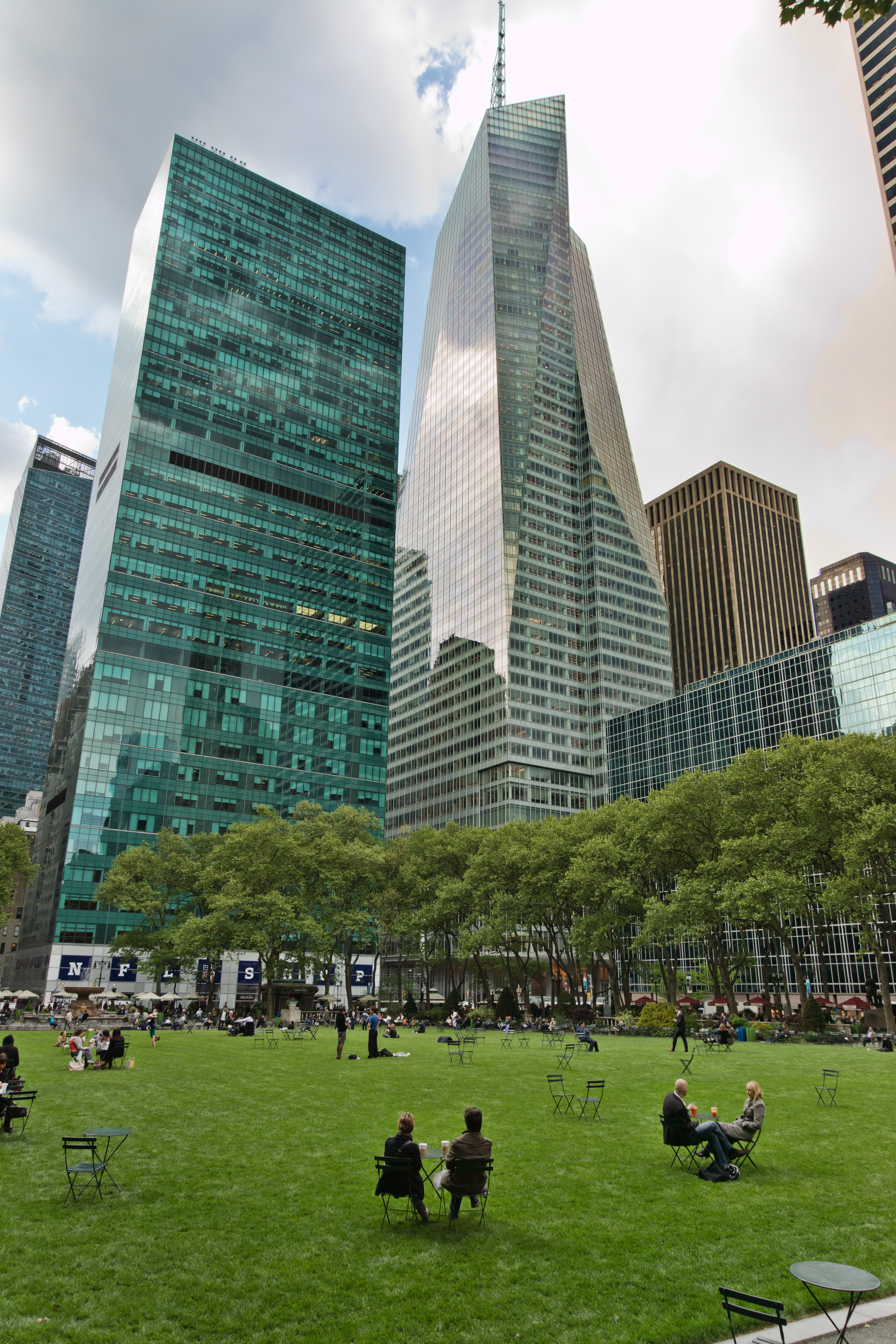
The lawn, facing west toward 1095 Avenue of the Americas (left) and Bank of America Tower (right)

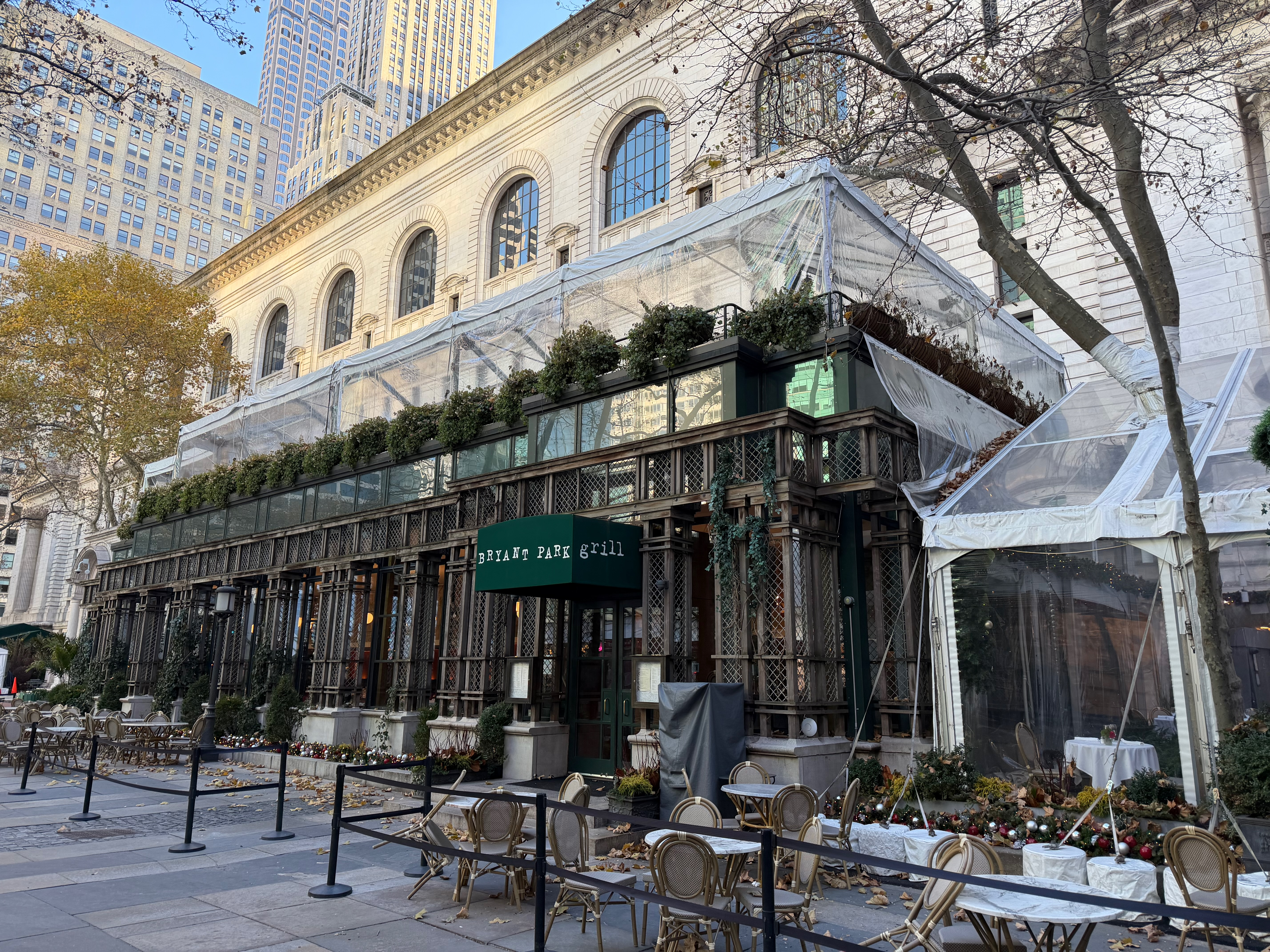
Bryant Park Grill (2025)

With security largely under the purview of the BPC, corporate control of the park has meant that Bryant Park received passive-recreation amenities, while excluding active sports that might cater to a broader urban public. The BPC added a custom-built carousel in 2002 and revived the tradition of an open-air library, the Reading Room, in 2003. In July 2002, the park launched a public wireless network, making the park the first in New York City to formally offer free Wi-Fi access to visitors. The Wi-Fi system was subsequently upgraded in 2008. Furthermore, the Pond, a free-admission ice skating rink, opened in the park in 2005. The park's public restrooms were renovated in 2006 and in 2017.

The dramatic rise in real estate values in the area around Bryant Park, as well as new construction in adjacent areas, was a consequence of the park's improvements. By 1993, the surrounding region had become a highly desirable office area, and formerly vacant office space around the park was being filled quickly. By the first decade of the 21st century, nearby buildings and businesses were also using names that referred to the park. This was shown by the then-new Bank of America Tower skyscraper at the park's northeast corner using the address "One Bryant Park", as well as the growing trend of Bryant Park vanity addresses, including 3, 4, 5, and 7 Bryant Park. National Public Radio, located just south of the park, also named a now-defunct talk show the "Bryant Park Project" upon the show's 2007 launch. Such enthusiasm to use the Bryant Park name would have been nonexistent in the 1980s, when the area was described as "the Wild West".

New real-estate developments were also built in the park's vicinity starting in the 21st century, which together added over 13,000 new workers to the area immediately surrounding Bryant Park. These included the Bank of America Tower; an expansion to 1095 Avenue of the Americas immediately to the south; Eleven Times Square a block west of Bryant Park; and 505 Fifth Avenue at Fifth Avenue and 42nd Street. Several hotels were also built, including a conversion of 485 Fifth Avenue at 41st Street, a Residence Inn by Marriott at Sixth Avenue and 39th Street. By the early 2010s, investors were purchasing buildings around Bryant Park south of 42nd Street as part of a small real estate boom. Rents per square foot in buildings south of 42nd Street had historically been lower than rents in buildings north of 42nd Street. Conversely, 1095 Avenue of the Americas and 452 Fifth Avenue were able to attract comparatively high rental rates despite both being south of 42nd Street. Later in the decade, the area around Bryant Park started growing into a residential neighborhood, with the construction of new developments in the area. Within a two-block radius of the park, or roughly 500 feet (150 m), units routinely sold for millions of dollars.

By 2024, the Bryant Park Grill's lease was about to expire. The BPC solicited bids for the restaurant's space, leasing it in January 2025 to a branch of the Jean-Georges restaurant, which planned to renovate the space for $12 million; the Bryant Park Grill's owner sued the BPC in April 2025 to prevent Jean-Georges from using its space. After a judge granted a temporary injunction, Bryant Park Grill indicated that it would not move out when its lease expired that month, which led to litigation over the restaurant's continued occupancy of its space.

== Description ==
Bryant Park is located between Fifth and Sixth Avenues and between 40th and 42nd Streets, and covers 9.6 acres (3.9 ha). Although technically the main branch of the New York Public Library is located within the park, in design it forms the eastern boundary of the park's green space, making Sixth Avenue the park's primary entrance. Bryant Park is used mostly as a passive recreation space, and lacks active sports facilities. Bryant Park is several steps above the surrounding streets, enclosed by a retaining wall. Granite stairs at several locations provide access from the surrounding sidewalks. The surrounding area contains numerous structures, including the Bank of America Tower and 1095 Avenue of the Americas to the northwest; the Bryant Park Studios, American Radiator Building, Engineers' Club Building, and 452 Fifth Avenue to the south; 461 Fifth Avenue and the Stavros Niarchos Foundation Library to the southeast; and 500 Fifth Avenue, the Aeolian Building, and the W.R. Grace Building to the north.

One of the park's largest features is a large lawn located slightly below the level of the surrounding walkways. Besides serving as a "lunchroom" for office workers, the lawn serves as the seating area for some of the park's major events, such as Bryant Park Movie Nights, Broadway in Bryant Park, and Square Dance. The lawn's season runs from February until October, when it is closed to make way for Bank of America Winter Village.

Numerous walkways surround the central lawn. The northern and southern sides are each flanked by two flagstone walkways. Each of these walkways is bordered by London plane (Platanus × hispanica) trees, which contribute to the park's European feel. In addition, numerous statues are scattered throughout the park. A raised terrace on the eastern side of the lawn, which dates to the construction of the library's main branch, is paved with gray flagstones and red brick. Its centerpiece is the William Cullen Bryant Memorial, which is raised on a pedestal of its own.

A restroom structure is located at the northern border of the park along 42nd Street. A carousel, installed in 2002, is located at the park's southern border. The park is served by the New York City Subway's 7, <7>, B, D, F, <F>, and M trains at 42nd Street–Bryant Park/Fifth Avenue station, entrances to which are located on the northern and western borders of the park, as well as MTA Regional Bus Operations' M1, M2, M3, M4, M5, M7, M42, M55 and Q32 routes.

=== Art and monuments ===
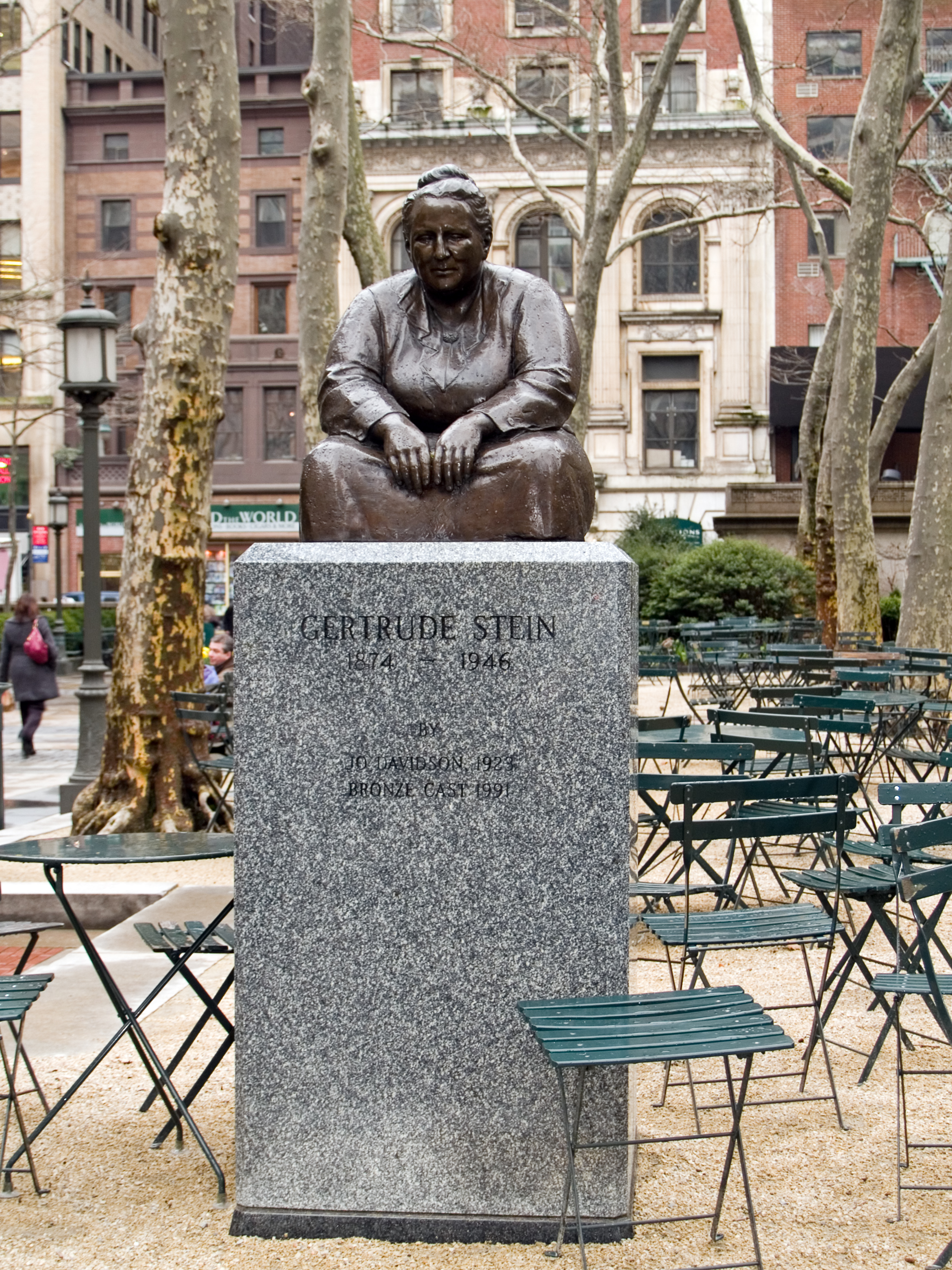
The statue of Gertrude Stein, installed in 1992

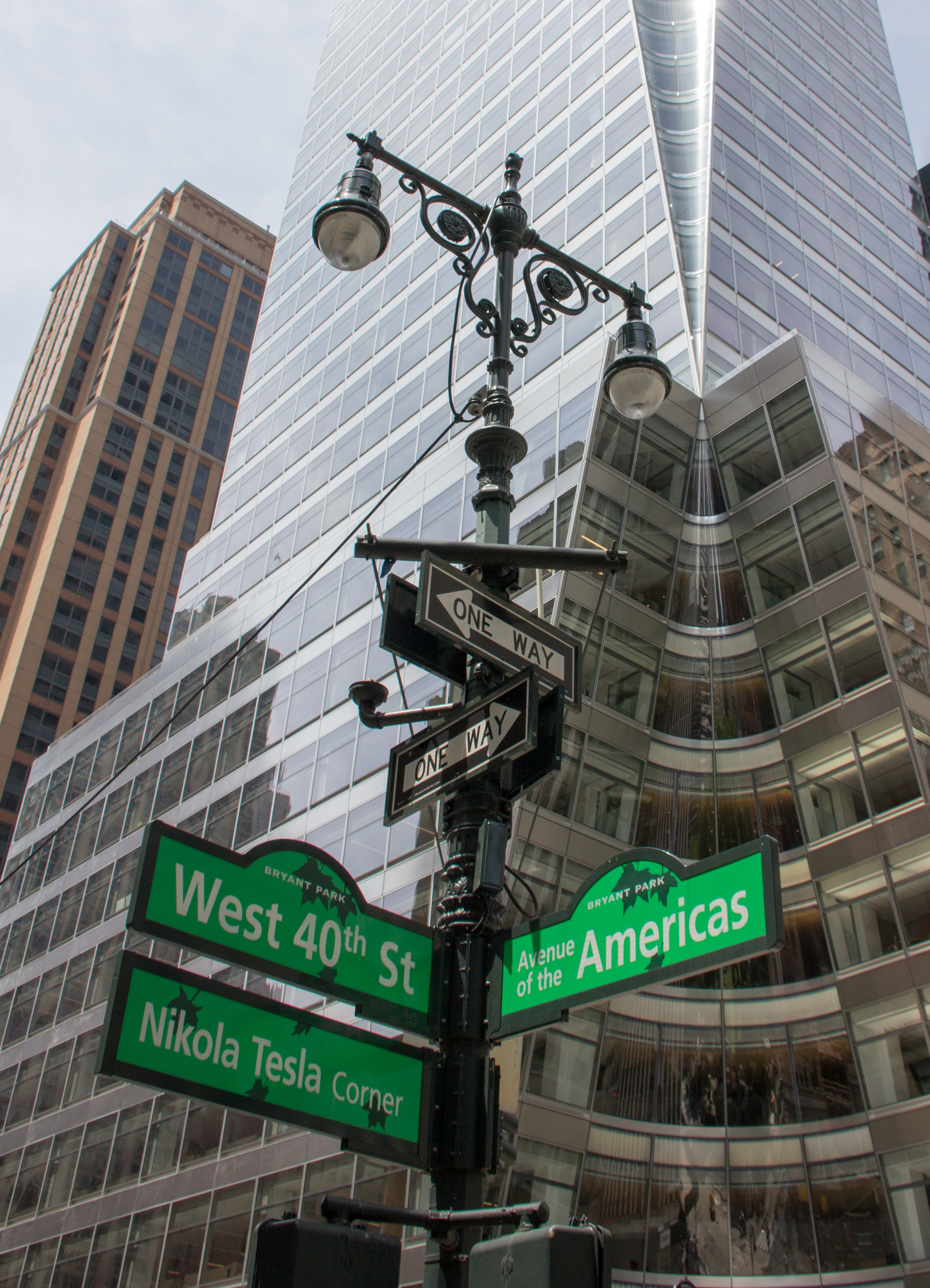
Street sign for Nikola Tesla Corner

==== Sculptures ====
Notable sculptures in the park include or have included:

- Statue of William E. Dodge (1885), a standing figure located on a pedestal at the park's northern border
- Statue of J. Marion Sims (1894), removed in the 1930s
- Washington Irving (1894), removed in the 1930s
- William Cullen Bryant Memorial (1911), a standing figure located on a canopied pedestal at the park's eastern border
- Josephine Shaw Lowell Memorial Fountain (1913), located at the park's western border; the fountain collects about $3,000 to $4,000 in coins each year, from dozens of countries
- Bust of Johann Wolfgang von Goethe (1932), a bust located at the park's southern border
- Statue of José Bonifácio de Andrada (1954, dedicated 1955), a standing figure located on a pedestal at the park's southwestern corner
- Statue of Gertrude Stein (1992), a sitting figure located at the park's southeastern corner
- Statue of Benito Juárez (2002), a standing figure located on a pedestal at the park's northwestern corner

==== Other memorials ====
The northwest corner of Bryant Park, at Sixth Avenue and 42nd Street, contains the Heiskell Plaza, a stairway and entrance plaza paved with flagstones. It was placed in 1993 in honor of Andrew Heiskell, a cofounder of the BPC.

The southwest corner of Bryant Park, at Sixth Avenue and 40th Street, is known as Nikola Tesla Corner. Tesla, an inventor, lived in the nearby New Yorker Hotel in his later years, and would feed pigeons in the park. The placement of the sign was due to the efforts of the Croatian Club of New York in cooperation with New York City officials, and Ljubo Vujovic of the Tesla Memorial Society of New York.

=== Carousel ===
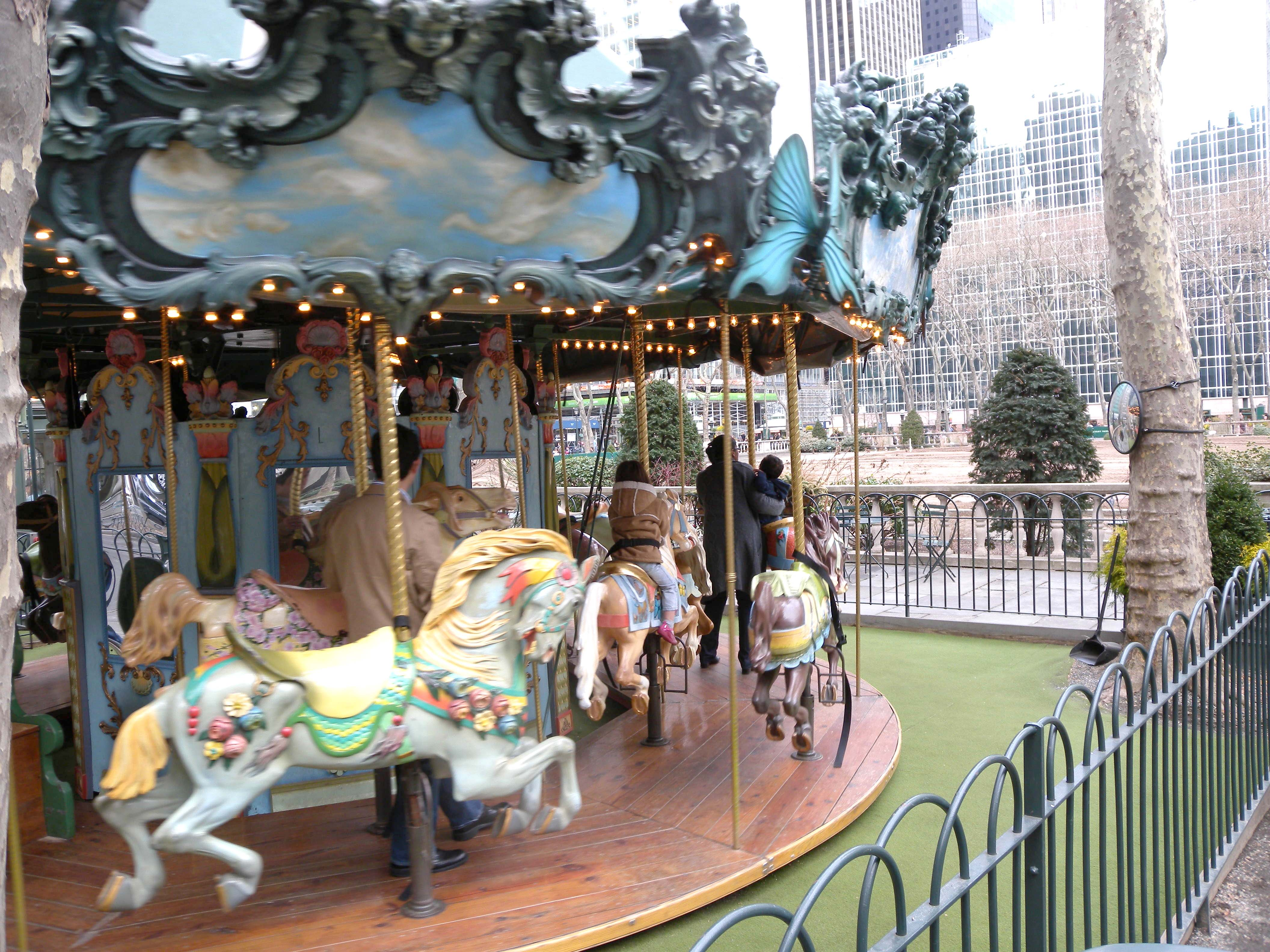
Le Carrousel designed by Marvin Sylvor

Bryant Park contains a carousel called Le Carrousel Magique, located in the southern section of the park. The carousel was designed by Marvin Sylvor, created by the Fabricon Carousel Company, and installed in 2002. The company was selected after a carousel installation in Bryant Park was approved in 1997. The carousel has a diameter of 22 feet (6.7 m), weighs 12,000 pounds (5,400 kg), and contains 14 animal casts, of which 12 are capable of moving vertically. In keeping with the French theme of the park, it plays French music. It underwent a restoration in 2009. The carousel also has a ticket booth, measuring 7 feet (2.1 m) tall and 4 feet (1.2 m) wide, which was constructed in 1928 and was relocated from Paragon Park in Hull, Massachusetts.

=== Restrooms ===
Bryant Park contains a Beaux-Arts granite restroom structure on the northern border, along 42nd Street. There are two facilities, one for men and women, both of which are 315 square feet (29.3 m^{2}). These were built in 1911 along with the NYPL Main Branch, but due to the park's landmark status, they cannot be expanded. The exterior of each building contains a frieze with garland motifs. After being closed in the mid-1960s, they were restored by Kupiec & Koutsomitis and reopened in 1992. The restrooms have been described as being among the city's best. A subsequent renovation in 2006 solidified their status as, in the words of then-New York City Parks Commissioner Adrian Benepe, "the gold standard for park comfort stations." The restrooms were renovated again in 2017. Following the 2017 renovation, the restrooms contained rotating artworks selected from a collection of 225 works, as well as fresh flowers, classical music, attendants, and automatic toilets and faucets.

=== Reading room ===
The original Reading Room was founded in August 1935 to entertain unemployed workers during the Great Depression. Started as an initiative by the New York Public Library, the Reading Room provided the jobless with a place to interact and share ideas without having to pay money or show identification. Despite this, the library was well-used, being used by 50,000 people by its first anniversary. Theft was low, with only 34 publications being lost in the library's first year. By its third year, 400 books and 1,000 magazines were in circulation and were being perused by 70,000 people per year. Books from the NYPL, and donations of magazines and trade publications from publishers, contributed to the success of the open-air library. The tradition of Reading Rooms halted in 1944 due to a staff shortage during World War II.

The Reading Room tradition was revived in 2003 with HSBC as its first sponsor. Oxford University Press, Scholastic Corporation, Mitchell's NY, Condé Nast Publications, Time Inc., Hachette Filipacchi Media U.S., and Rodale, Inc. were among the companies who donated books and publications. In addition to the complimentary reading materials, in 2004 programming was added to Reading Room's content. The Reading Room features readings and book sales by contemporary writers and poets, plus book-related special events such as book clubs, writers workshops and storytelling for kids.

=== Bank of America Winter Village ===
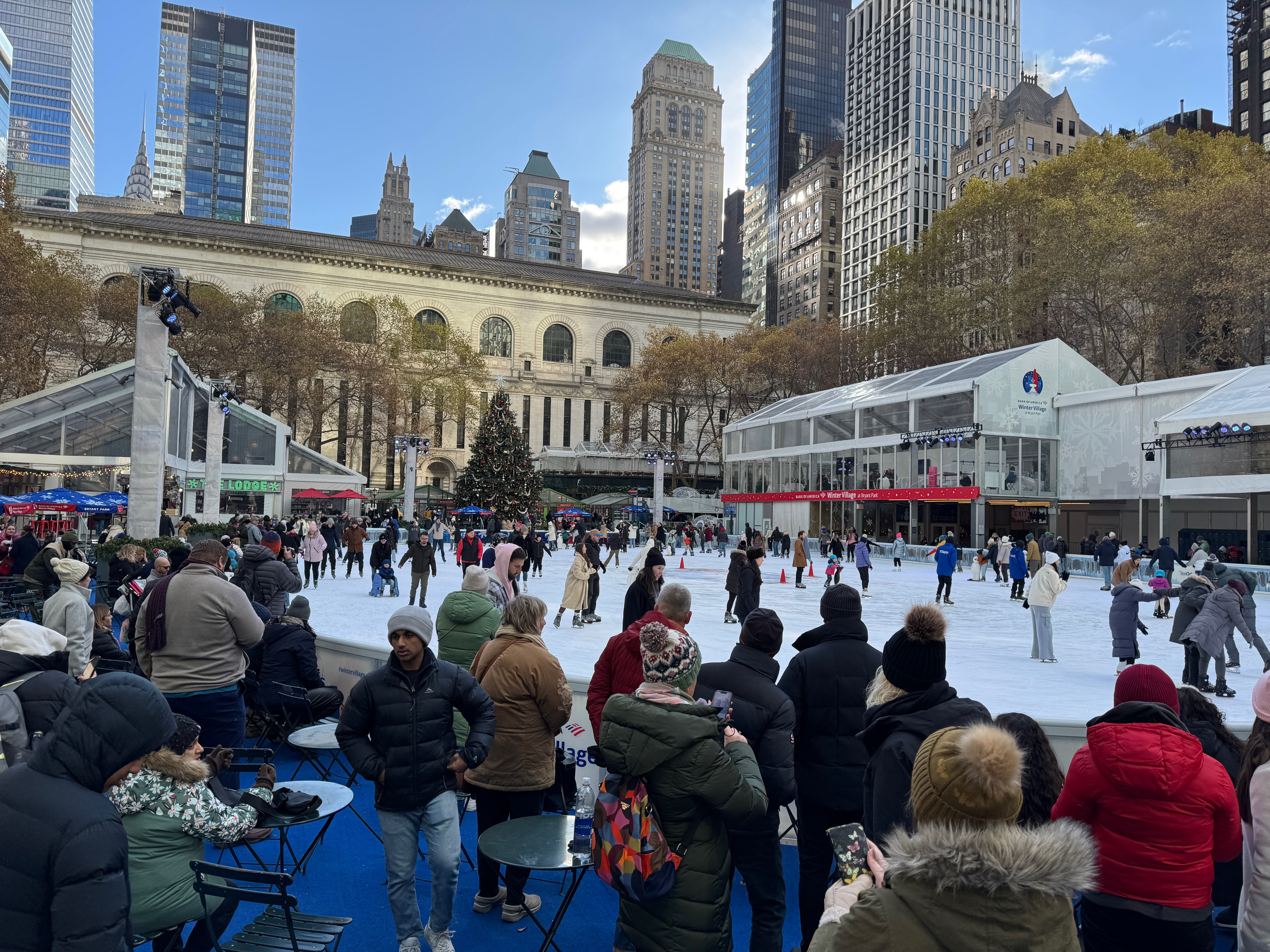
The rink at Bank of America Winter Village

Modeled on Europe's Christkindlmarkt, in 2002 Bryant Park introduced the Holiday Shops in an effort to liven up the park space during the winter. Initially slow to gain traction, the Holiday Shops became a fixture of the Manhattan holiday scene in 2005 by adding an ice-skating rink. The Shops also include a Norway Spruce tree, as well as a standalone dining and event space.

Sponsored by Bank of America, Winter Village can be set up within two weeks. In September 2016, Bryant Park Corporation announced market makers Urbanspace as the new operator for the Holiday Shops, which grew from 80 boutiques in 2002 to over 170 in 2018. In 2018, Urbanspace also took over management of the rinkside eatery, rebranding it as The Lodge. The Gothamist wrote in 2024 that visitors had mixed views of Winter Village; though tourists and some New Yorkers liked Winter Village's shops and food stands, detractors felt that the shops were overcrowded.

== Private operation ==
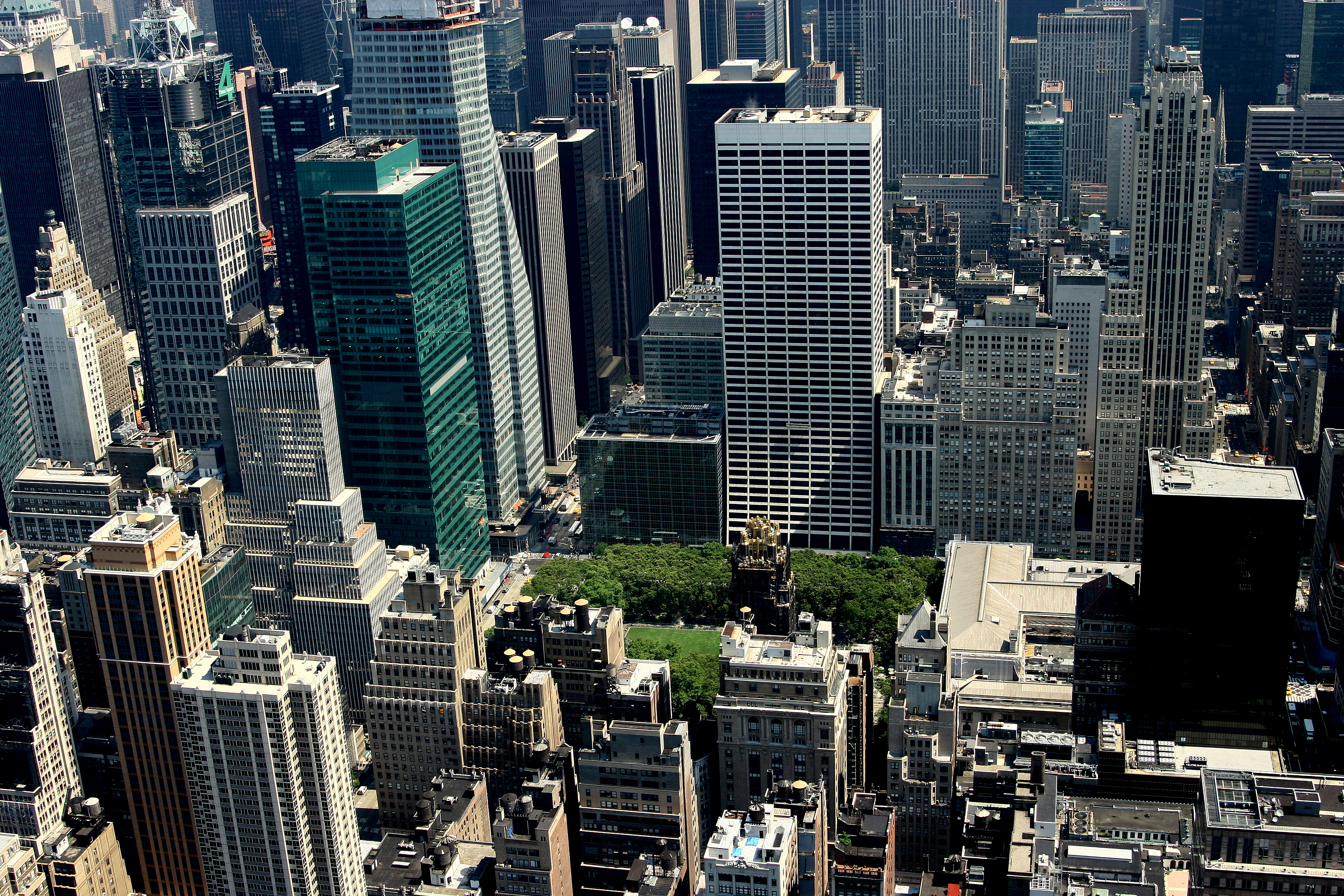
The park from above, a bit of green amid Midtown Manhattan's buildings

The Bryant Park Corporation (BPC), formerly the Bryant Park Restoration Corporation (BPRC), manages the park. BPC also oversees the Bryant Park Management Corporation (BPMC), which was created to manage the Bryant Park business improvement district.

Although Bryant Park is a public park, BPC accepts no public funds. It was initially supported by the Rockefeller Brothers Fund, but by the 21st century it received funding through tax assessments on surrounding property within the business improvement district, fees from concessionaires, and revenue from public events. As of 2024, the BPC raised about $29 million annually from sources such as rent payments and sponsorships. To obtain accurate data about park usage, BPC counts the number of patrons in Bryant Park at 1 p.m. and 6 p.m. every day.

The number of events at the park grew significantly after its reopening, causing some consternation by people who feared that the park would be dominated by private entities, thus would be inaccessible to the public. As a result, BPC makes most events free and open to the public. One exception was the New York Fashion Week shows that formerly took over the park for two weeks in the winter and late summer each year. BPC cofounder Dan Biederman often publicly expressed his frustration that the fashion shows were not under BPC's control. "They pay us a million dollars. It's a million dollars I would happily do without," he told the Los Angeles Times. BPC was particularly frustrated that the fashion shows dominated the park during two crucial times: in late summer, when the weather is perfect for park visitors; and in early February, necessitating the early closure of the park's popular free-admission ice-skating rink.

== Programming ==
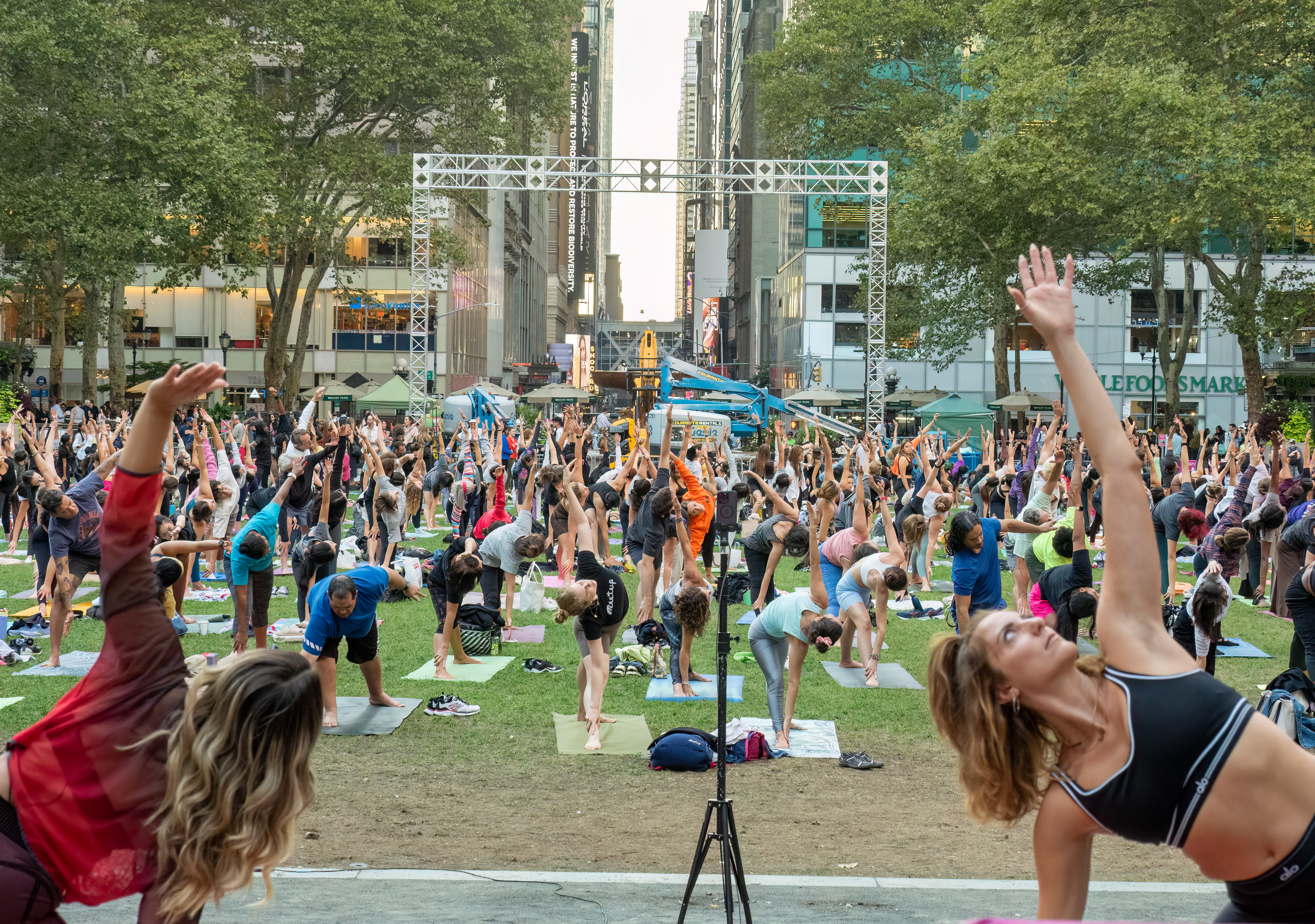
Public yoga class on the lawn

Numerous events are hosted on the lawn at Bryant Park. Bryant Park Movie Nights, begun in the early 1990s, take place on Monday evenings during the summer. Various free musical performances are sponsored by corporations during months with warm weather, including Broadway in Bryant Park, sponsored by iHeartMedia and featuring performers from current Broadway musicals, integrated with content provided by event sponsors.

The park has various activity areas open all day long, including board games, chess and backgammon, a putting green and Kubb area, an Art Cart, ping pong tables, and Petanque courts. The parks also offer free classes in juggling, yoga, tai chi, and knitting. In the 40th Street plaza of the park, there is a station called Bryant Park Games where visitors can borrow an array of games, including Chinese chess and quoits. In addition, chess and table tennis can also be played at Bryant Park.

Food and drink are served at four park-operated concessionary kiosks. There are two additional kiosks on Fifth Avenue, bringing the total of concessionaires near Bryant Park to six.

=== Former programming ===
Formerly, Bryant Park hosted New York Fashion Week (NYFW) shows, which took over the park for two weeks in the winter and late summer each year. NYFW, which moved to Bryant Park in 1993, was forced to set fees for its shows after Manhattan Community Board 5 disapproved of a free fashion show on the grounds that three-fourths of profits would go to BPC and only one-fourth to NYC Parks. Dan Biederman of the BPC had called the profits from NYFW "a million dollars I would happily do without," and lamented the fact that NYFW took over the park at two high-traffic periods: late summer and late winter. NYFW moved from Bryant Park in 2010 after disagreements with the BPC.

== Landmark designations ==
Bryant Park and the New York Public Library Main Branch were jointly listed on the National Register of Historic Places (NRHP) in 1966. Its listing on the NRHP is distinct from the "New York Public Library" on the same day, which covered just the main branch building. In addition, in 1974, the New York City Landmarks Preservation Commission designated the park as a New York City scenic landmark.

== See also ==
- List of New York City Designated Landmarks in Manhattan from 14th to 59th Streets
- List of New York City parks
- List of New York City scenic landmarks
- National Register of Historic Places listings in Manhattan from 14th to 59th Streets
