= List of buildings and structures on Broadway in Manhattan =

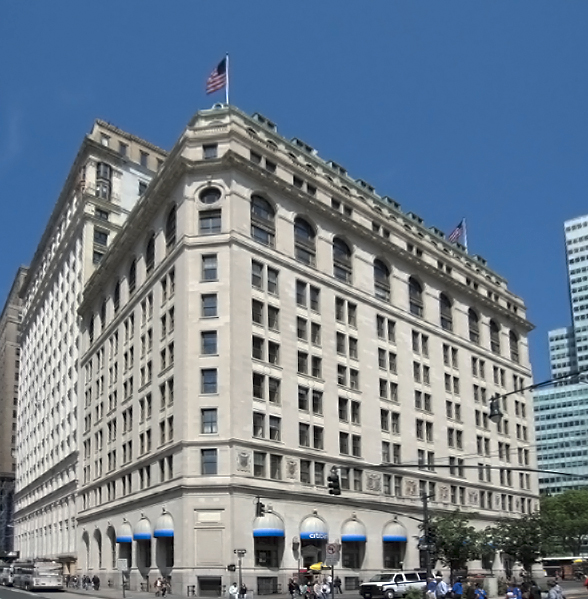
1 Broadway

This list contains buildings and structures on Broadway in Manhattan, New York City.

== 1-599 (Battery Place - W. Houston Street) ==
- Alexander Hamilton U.S. Custom House
- International Mercantile Marine Company Building
- 2 Broadway
- Bowling Green
- Bowling Green Offices Building
- Cunard Building
- 26 Broadway
- 52 Broadway
- Adams Express Building
- 65 Broadway
- Empire Building
- 1 Wall Street
- AXA Equitable Life Insurance Company
- Trinity Church
- Equitable Building
- Trinity and United States Realty Buildings
- Equitable Life Building
- Marine Midland Building
- Zuccotti Park
- One Liberty Plaza
- Fulton Center
- Corbin Building
- American Surety Building
- 195 Broadway
- Astor House
- St. Paul's Chapel
- 222 Broadway
- Transportation Building
- Woolworth Building
- City Hall Park
- 250 Broadway
- 253, 256 Broadway (Home Life Building)
- 258 Broadway (Rogers Peet Building)
- New York City Hall
- Tower 270
- Broadway–Chambers Building
- 280 Broadway
- 287 Broadway
- 290 Broadway (Ted Weiss Federal Building)
- 291 Broadway (East River Savings)
- 305 Broadway (Langdon Building)
- 319 Broadway (Metropolitan Life Insurance Company Home Office)
- Appleton Building
- Clock Tower Building
- 359 Broadway
- 361 Broadway (James S. White Building)
- Jacob K. Javits Federal Building
- 395 Broadway (Pearl River Mart)
- 415 Broadway (National City Bank of New York)
- 425 Broadway (Le Boutillier Brothers Store)
- 429 Broadway (A. J. Ditenhoffer Warehouse)
- 459 Broadway (D. Devlin & Do. Store)
- 462 Broadway
- Mechanics' Hall
- 482 Broadway (Roosevelt Building)
- 486 Broadway (Mechanics & Traders Bank)
- E. V. Haughwout Building
- New Era Building
- 502 Broadway (C. G. Gunther's Sons Store)
- 503 Broadway (Loubat Stores Building)
- 521 Broadway (St. Nicholas Hotel)
- 517 Broadway (De Forest Building)
- 555 Broadway (Charles Broadway Rouss Building)
- Scholastic Building
- 575 Broadway (Rogers Peet Store)
- 591 Broadway (Singer Building)

== 600-1499 (W. Houston St. - Times Square) ==
- The Cable Building
- 640 Broadway
- Canterbury Hall
- Grace Church
- Church of the Messiah
- Grand Central Hotel
- 770 Broadway
- Strand Bookstore
- Mercer Street Residence Hall
- Department of Psychology
- NYU Health Center
- Tisch School of the Arts
- Hilary Gardens
- Georgetown Plaza
- Mercantile Library Building
- Grace Church
- 826 Broadway
- 827–831 Broadway
- 832–834 Broadway
- 836 Broadway
- 840 Broadway
- 841 Broadway
- Gandhi Statue
- George Washington Statue
- Union Square Park
- Lincoln Building
- Springler Building
- 15 Union Square West
- Bank of the Metropolis
- Decker Building
- 889 Broadway
- 900 Broadway
- Flatiron Building
- Madison Green Residential Plaza
- William Henry Seward Monument
- Madison Square Park
- NoMad Hotel
- Albemarle Hotel
- Ace Hotel
- Baudouine Building
- Gilsey House
- Grand Hotel
- 1250 Broadway
- Radisson Hotel Martinique
- Hotel McAlpin
- Herald Square
- Herald Square Building
- Haier Building
- Knickerbocker Theatre
- Marbridge Building
- 1400 Broadway
- 1407 Broadway
- Rialto Theatre
- World Apparel Center
- One Times Square
- Pabst Hotel (demolished)
- Condé Nast Building
- The Knickerbocker Hotel

== 1500-1800 (Times Square - Columbus Circle) ==
- 1500 Broadway (previously occupied by Hotel Claridge)
- Paramount Theatre
- 1501 Broadway
- One Astor Plaza
- Astor Theatre
- Minskoff Theatre
- New York Marriott Marquis
- Bertelsmann Building
- 1552 Broadway
- Palace Theatre
- Morgan Stanley Building
- Crowne Plaza Times Square Manhattan
- Brill Building
- Winter Garden Theatre
- Novotel New York
- The Manhattan at Times Square Hotel
- Central Theatre
- Capitol Theatre
- Ellen's Stardust Diner
- Paramount Plaza
- Studebaker Building
- 1675 Broadway
- Broadway Theatre
- Ed Sullivan Theater
- 1700 Broadway
- 1717 Broadway
- 1740 Broadway
- Random House Tower
- Symphony House
- 224 West 57th Street
- Central Park Tower
- 1790 (5 Columbus Circle)
- 240 Central Park South
- Columbus Circle

== North of Columbus Circle ==
- Museum of Biblical Art (1865 Broadway)
- Dauphin Hotel (demolished)
- Apple Bank Building (2100 Broadway)
- The Ansonia (2109 Broadway)
- Beacon Theatre (2124 Broadway)
- Hotel Beacon
- Hotel Belleclaire (2175 Broadway)
- The Apthorp (2201 Broadway)
- First Baptist Church in the City of New York (near 2221 Broadway)
- Bretton Hall (2350 Broadway)
- The Belnord
- Metro Theater (2626 Broadway)
- Hotel Marseilles (2689–2693 Broadway)
- Manhasset Apartments (2801–2825 Broadway)
- Goddard Institute for Space Studies (2880 Broadway)
- Barnard College (3009 Broadway)
- Audubon Ballroom (3940 Broadway)
- United Palace (4140 Broadway)
- Dyckman House (4881 Broadway)
- Church of the Good Shepherd (4967 Broadway)
