= William H. Hume =

American architect

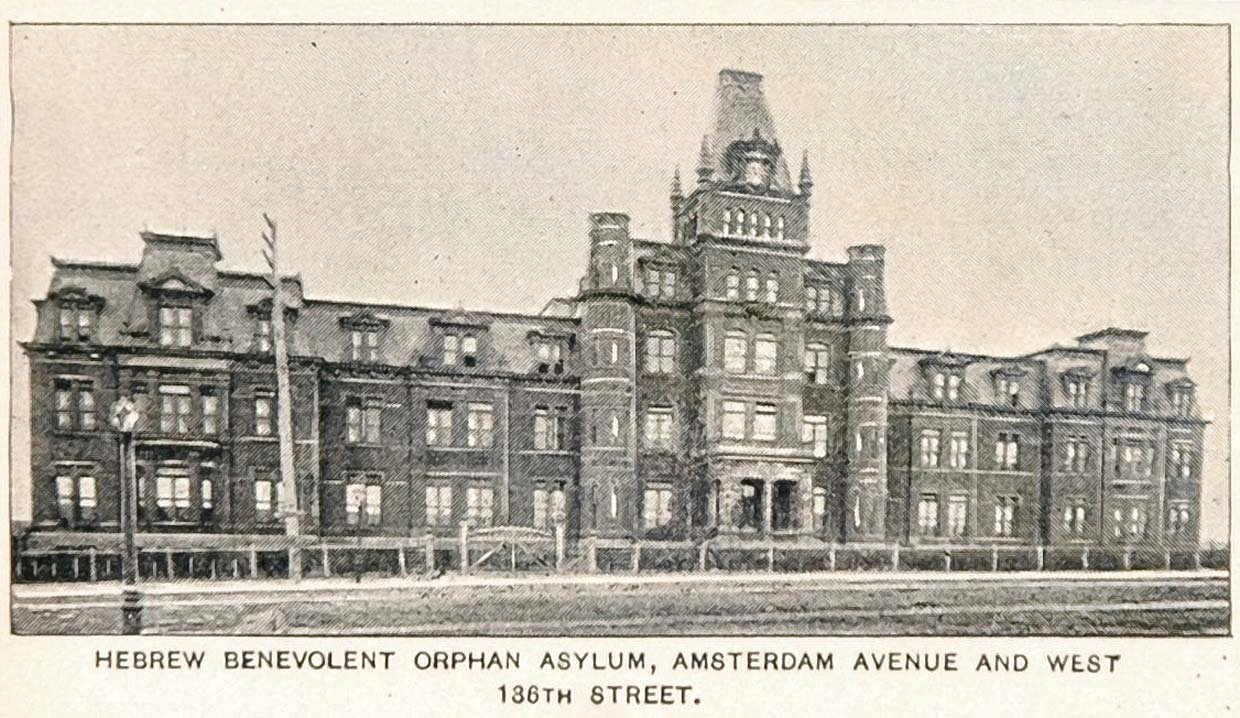
Hebrew Orphan Asylum of New York (built 1884, demolished 1955-1956) depicted here in 1893.

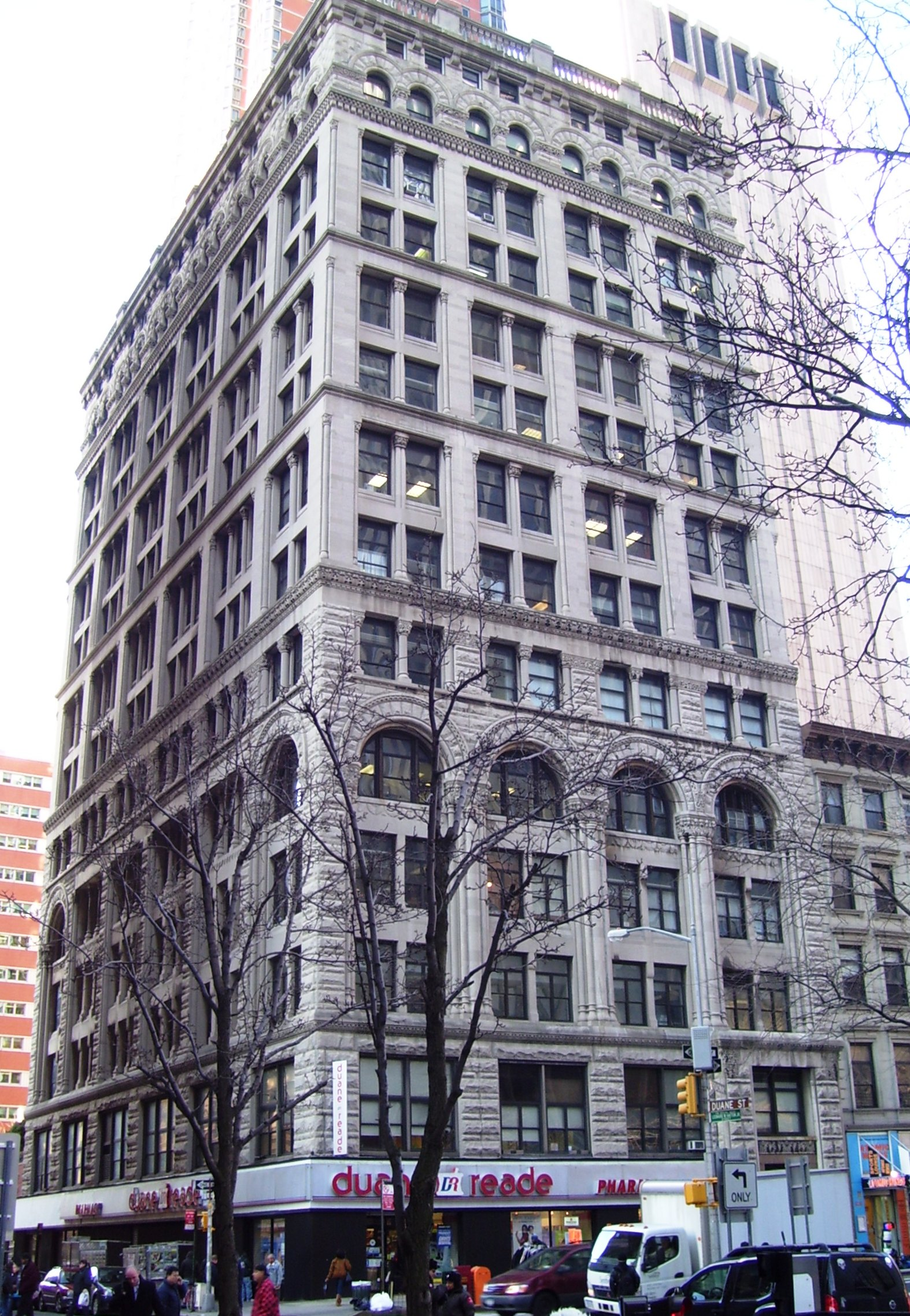
Mutual Reserve Building at 305 Broadway in Manhattan, New York City was built in 1892–94 and was designed by William H. Hume in the Romanesque Revival style in the Richardsonian mode. Designated a New York City landmark on December 20, 2011

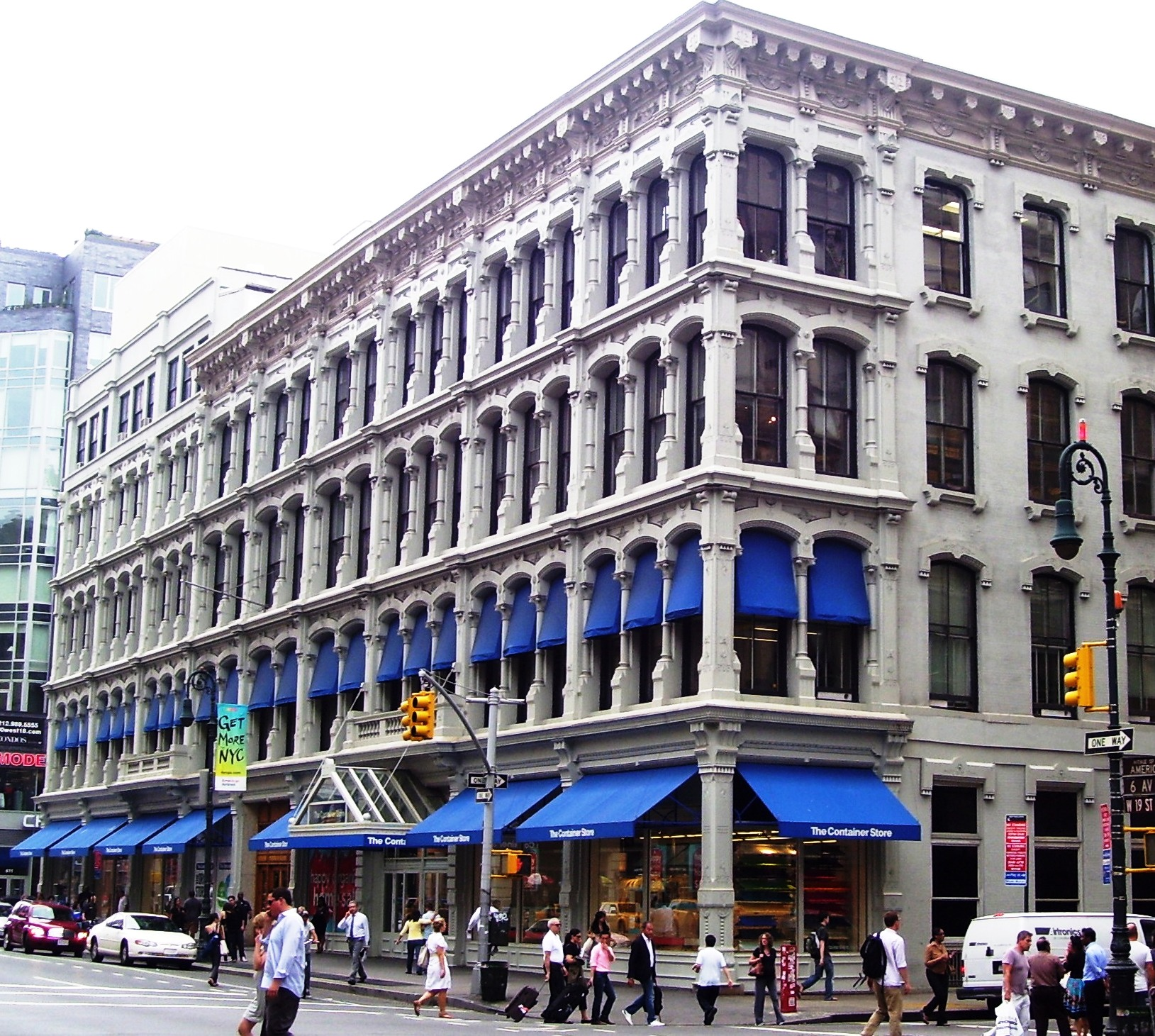
Originally the B. Altman Dry Goods Store, designed by David & John Jardine and built 1876–77 with addition on the south in 1887 by William H. Hume

William H. Hume was an American architect in New York City.

== Notable works ==
His work included the Hebrew Orphan Asylum of New York (1884) on Amsterdam Avenue (used as an Army Hall in 1943 and then by City College, the site is now the Jacob H. Schiff Playground); the Langdon Building at 305 Broadway; Scotch Presbyterian Church on 96th Street and Central Park West (during the booming 1920s it was replaced by a "Skyscraper Church" designed by Rosario Candela; constructed in 1928–29 it included a 16-story apartment tower and a new church sanctuary and classroom space set into the base and fronting West 96th Street); the Hotel New Netherland (1892), replaced by the Sherry Netherland Hotel in 1927; and the Hotel Normandie.

Hume designed an addition to the B. Altman Dry Goods Store at 615–629 Avenue of the Americas (Sixth Avenue), between West 18th and 19th Streets in the Flatiron District of Manhattan, New York City. The original B. Altman store was built 1876–77 (David & John Jardine), with Hume's addition on the south added in 1887, and another addition on West 18th Street by Buchman & Fox in 1909. B. Altman moved to Fifth Avenue and 34th Street in 1906. The current street retail occupant of the Sixth Avenue structure is The Container Store.

William H. Hume & Son designed the Spingler Building (1896) at 5–9 Union Square West. It is located on the west side of Union Square between the Lincoln Building and the former Tiffany & Co. headquarters at 15 Union Square West. Other work included the Simpson Crawford Simpson Store (1900) and plans for the Masonic Home and School in Utica, New York.

== Critical review ==
Margot Gayle, writing in Cast-Iron Architecture in New York: a Photographic Survey (1974), says of 83–87 Grand St., "Architect William H. Hume did it in 1883 as a silk showroom and warehouse – an addition to that section of the building ... which had been erected 10 years earlier. Perhaps it was part of an original grand plan, for the architect had the iron elements for this big addition cast in exactly the same design as for the first building, resulting in a unified whole. The older part of the building carries the date 1872 in its galvanized iron cornice, and displays the foundry label of Lindsay, Graff & Megquier." He is also credited with 83–87 Grand St., SW corner of Greene St. (1872) a "serene Tuscan over elaborate Corinithian".
