= List of libraries in 19th-century New York City =

This list includes libraries located in New York City active in the 19th century. Included are public libraries, academic libraries, medical libraries, church libraries, government libraries, circulating libraries, and subscription libraries.

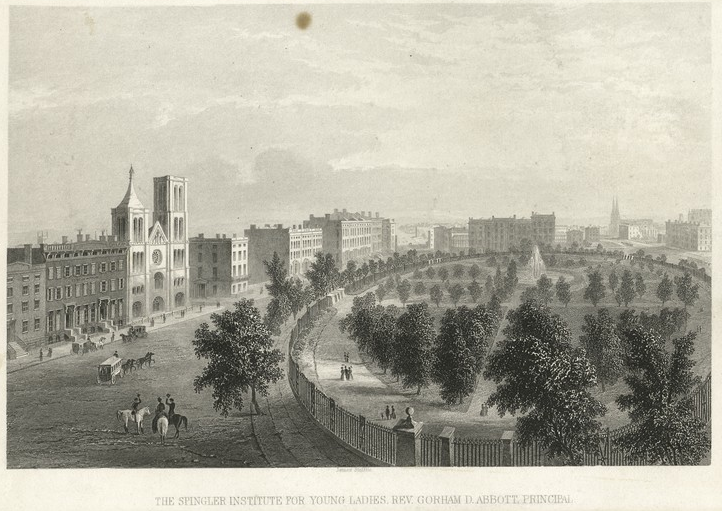
Spingler Institute, Union Square, 19th century

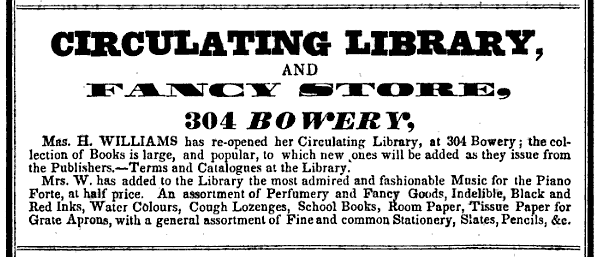
Advertisement for Helen Williams' Circulating Library and Fancy Store, no.304 Bowery, 1840

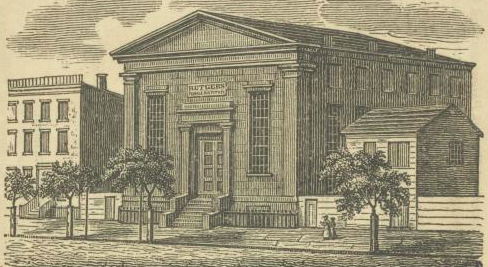
Rutgers Female Institute, Madison St., 1843

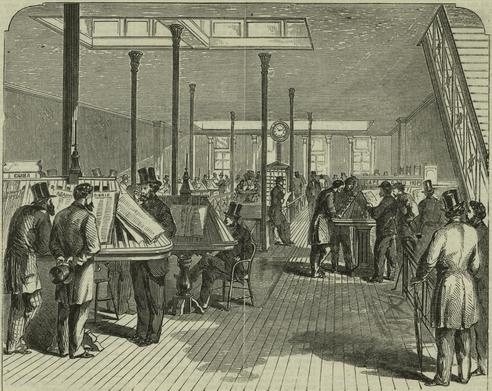
Merchants Exchange, reading-room, c. 1863

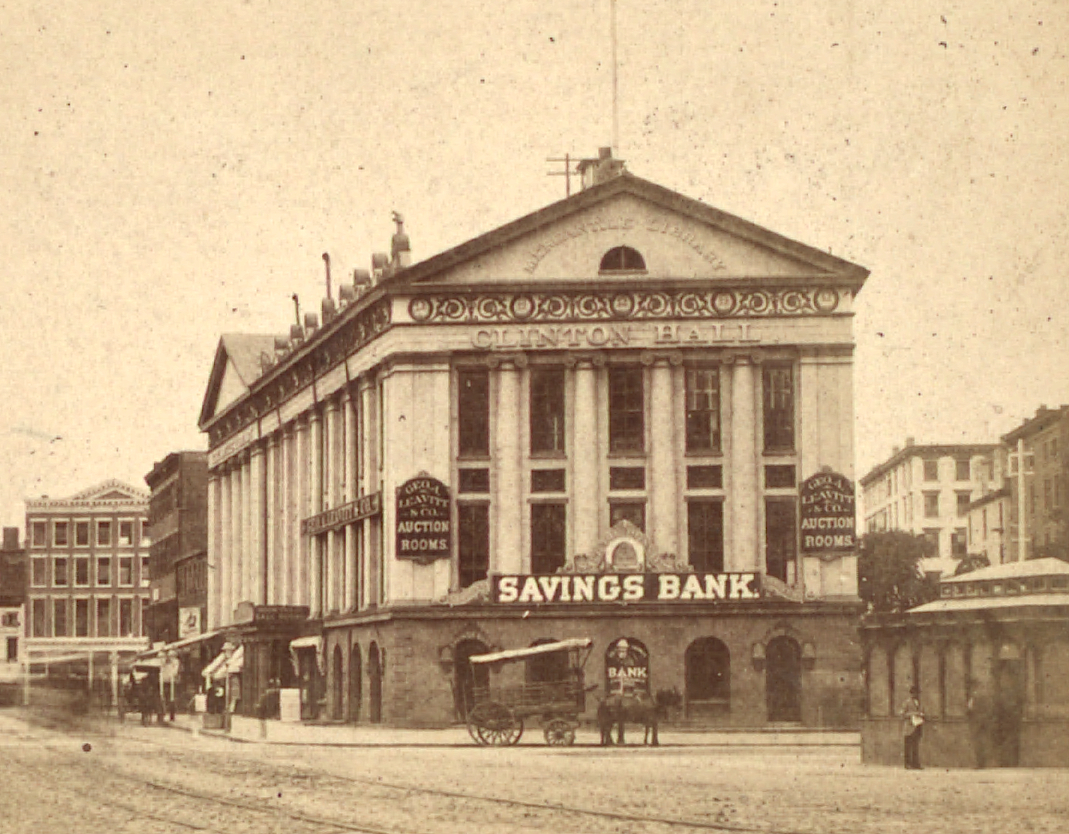
Mercantile Library, Clinton Hall, Astor Place, 19th century

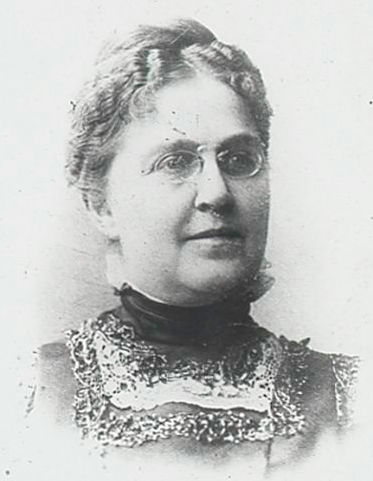
Portrait of Ellen M. Coe, chief librarian, NY Free Circulating Library

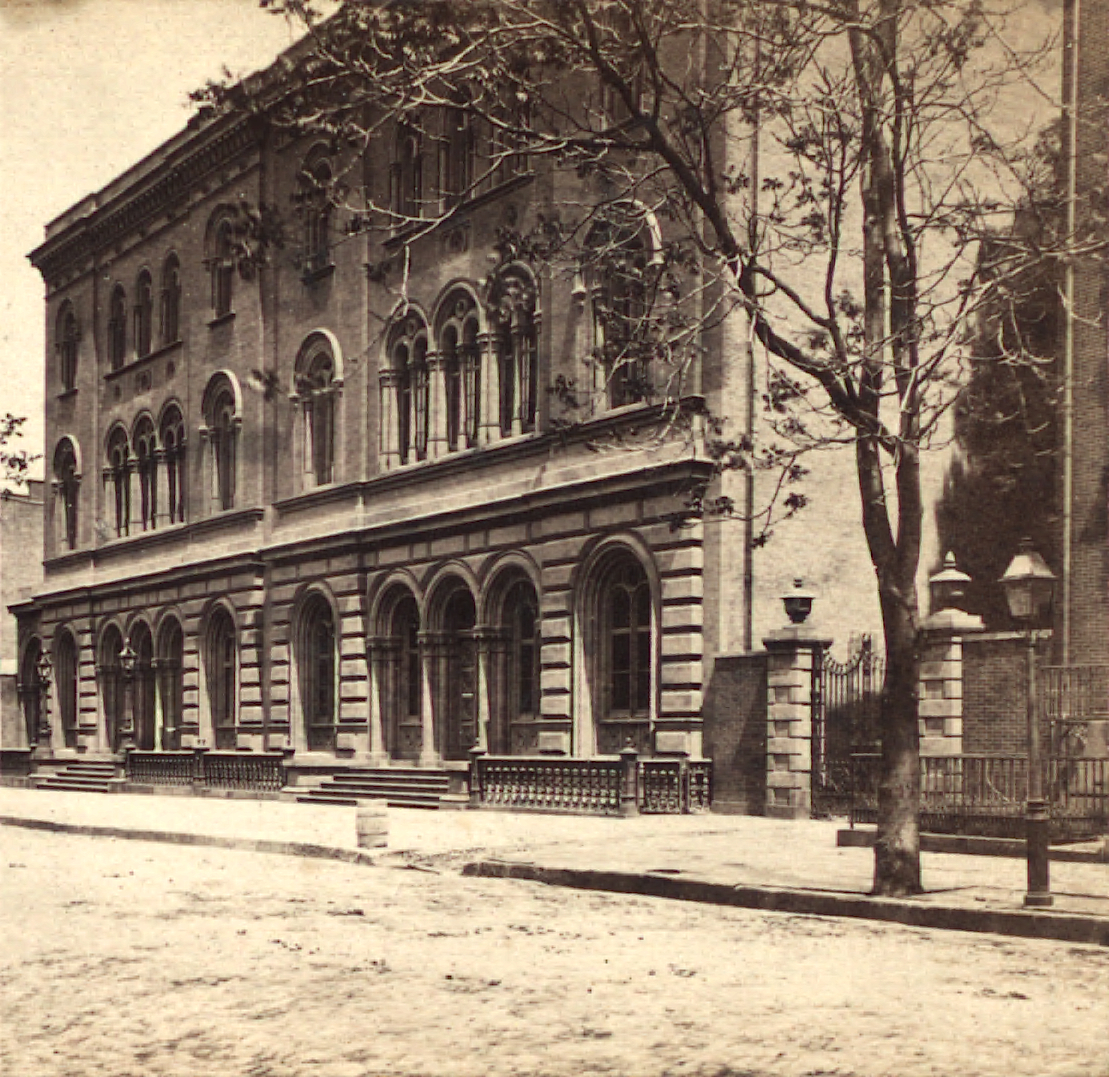
Astor Library, Lafayette Place, 19th century (later occupied by the Public Theater)

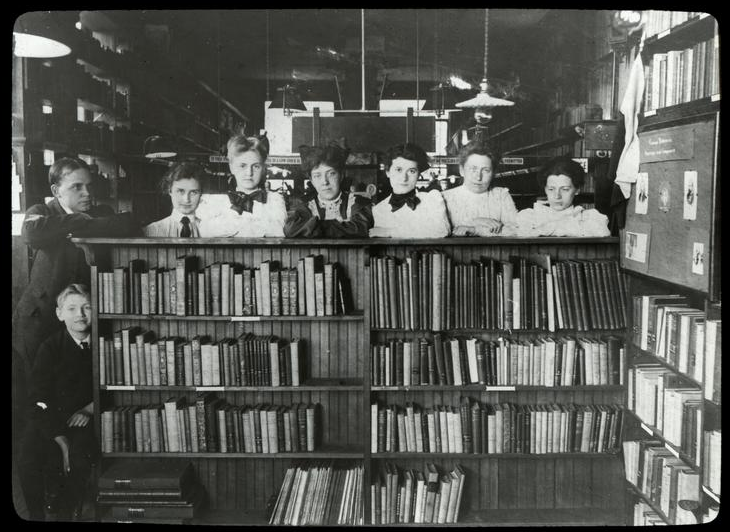
Webster Free Circulating Library, c. late 19th century

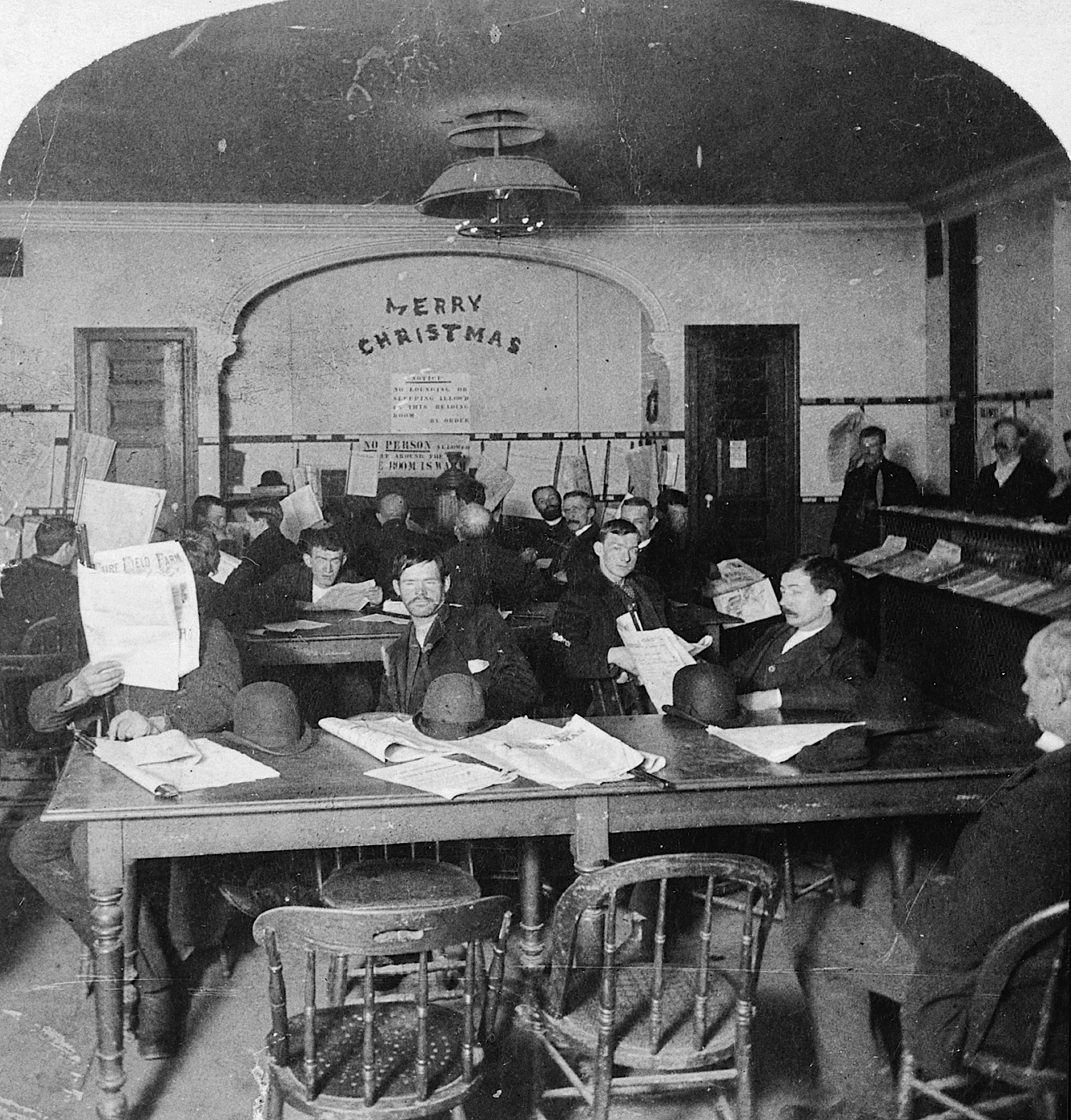
"A Free Reading Room, N.Y. City, U.S.A." 1891

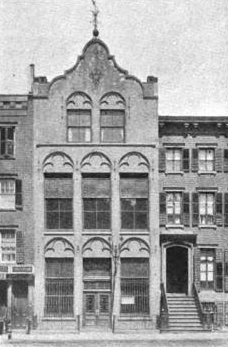
Jackson Square Branch of the N.Y. Free Circulating Library, West 13th St., c. 1893

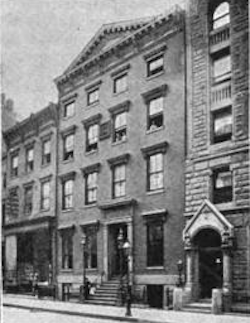
Apprentices Library, c. 1893

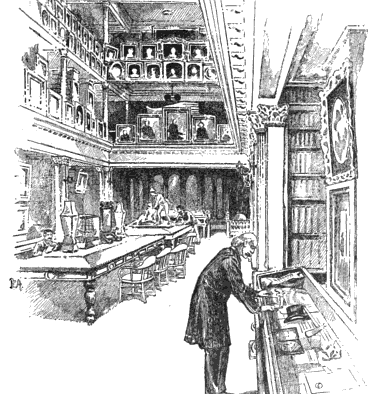
New York Society Library, 1894

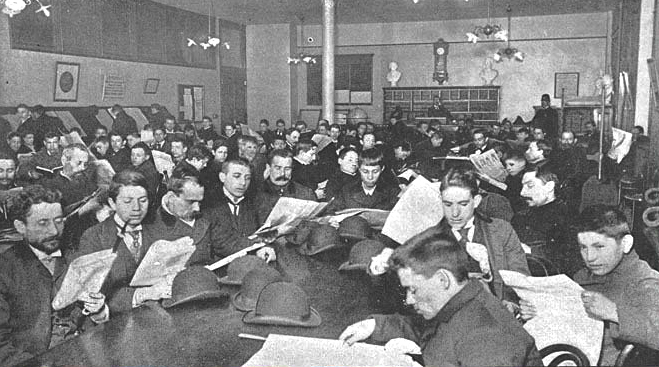
Aguilar Free Library, 1895

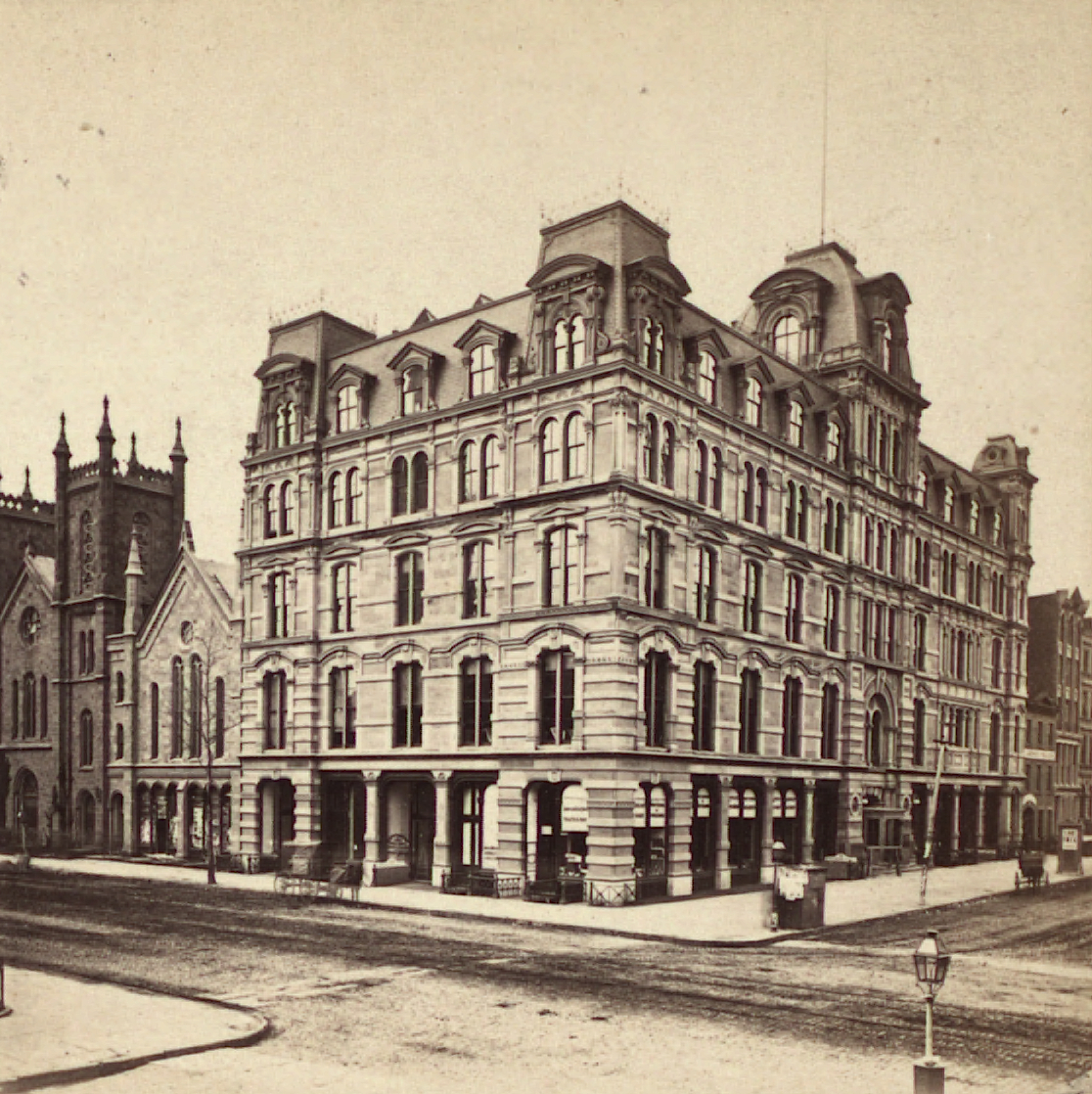
YMCA, 19th century

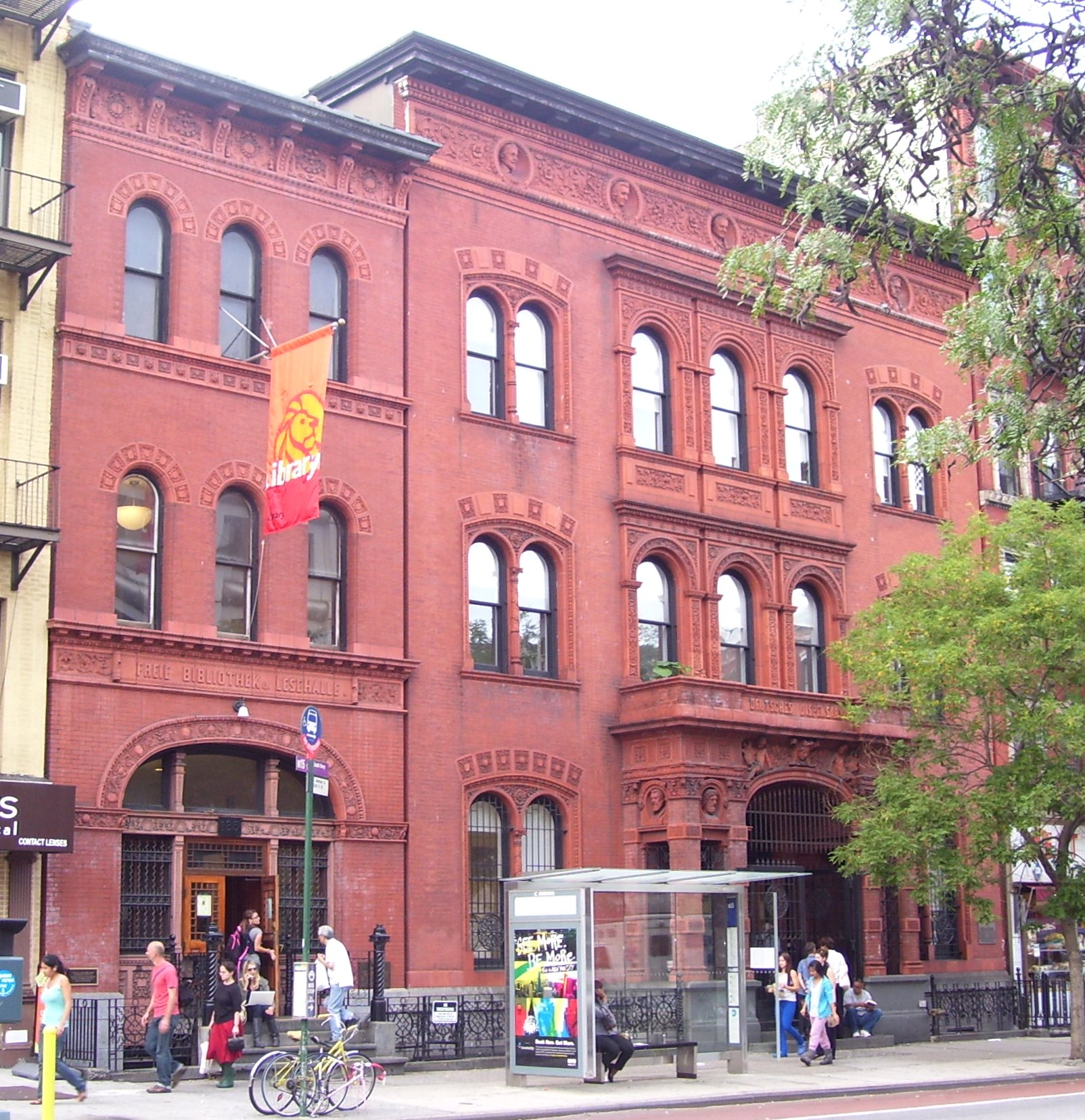
Ottendorfer Branch of the New York Free Circulating Library (left) Former building of the German Hospital (right); 2010 photo

== A ==
- Academy of Mt. St. Vincent library
- Aguilar Free Library (est.1886)
- Aldine Club
- American Bible Society
- American Bible Union
- American Congregational Union
- American Ethnological Society
- American and Foreign Bible Society
- American Geographical and Statistical Society
- American Institute (est.1828)
- American Institute of Mining Engineers Library
- American Literary Association
- American Museum of Natural History library
- American Numismatic and Archaeological Society
- American Seaman's Friend Society
- American Society of Civil Engineers
- American Society of Mechanical Engineers
- Anglo-African Reading Room, Prince St. (est.1859)
- Apprentices and Demilt Library, General Society of Mechanics and Tradesmen of the City of New York
- Aschenbroedel Verein Library
- Association of the Bar of the City of New York
- Astor Library
- William H. Atree's circulating library

== B ==
- Bacon Literary Association
- Bancroft Institute
- Samuel Berrian's circulating library
- Bowery Circulating Library; Caleb Bartlett
- Boys' Free Reading Room
- Broome Street Free Library

== C ==
- Hocquet Caritat's circulating library
- Cathedral Free Circulating Library
- Catholic Club Library
- Children's library
- City Library
- Clinton Place Female Seminary
- College of Pharmacy of City of New York
- College of Physicians and Surgeons
- College of St. Francis Xavier
- College of Veterinary Surgeons Library
- College Settlement Library
- James Collins' circulating library
- Colored Home and Hospital Library
- Colored Orphan Asylum Library
- Columbia College
- Cooper Institute
- Courtland-Street Library; William Stodart

== D ==
- De Witt Memorial Free Library

== E ==
- Ecelectic Medical College Library
- Episcopal Historical Society
- Episcopal Theological Seminary
- Equitable Life Assurance Social Law Library

== F ==
- Five Points Mission
- Francis' circulating library
- Franklin Library; Mr. Lockwood
- Free Academy
- Free Circulating Library for the Blind

== G ==
- Gaelic Society
- Genealogical and Biographical Society Library
- General Theological Seminary Library
- German Hospital and Dispensary Library
- A.T. Goodrich's circulating library
- Grammar School no.21, Holbrook Library
- Grolier Club (est.1884)

== H ==
- Harlem Law Library
- Harlem Library
- Health Department library
- Helmich & Co.'s German circulating library
- Horsfall's French circulating library
- House of Detention for Witnesses library
- House of Refuge

== I ==
- I.O. of O.F. Library
- Institute for the Deaf and Dumb
- Institution for the Blind
- Irving Literary Union
- Italian Free Reading-Room and Library

== J ==
- Juvenile Asylum

== K ==
- Adolph Kirsten's German library

== L ==
- La Salle Academy library
- Lenox Library (est.1871)
- Liter. Geselleschaft of Morrisania library
- Lorraine library
- Lyceum of Natural History

== M ==
- Maimonides Library Association
- Manhattan College Library
- Maritime Exchange library
- Masonic Library
- Mechanical Engineers Library
- Mechanics' Institute (est.1830)
- Medical College and Hospital for Women library
- Mercantile Library Association (est.1820)
- Merchants' and Clerks' Library Association
- Metropolis Law School library
- Metropolitan Medical College
- Metropolitan Museum of Art library
- Military Service Inst. library
- Minerva circulating library; W.B. Gilley
- John Montgomery's circulating library
- Mott Memorial Medical and Surg. library
- E. M. Murden's Circulating Library and Dramatic Repository

== N ==
- New-York Athenaeum (est.1824)
- New York City Library
- New York City Lunatic Asylum
- New York Free Circulating Library
- New York Historical Society
- New York Hospital
- New York Law Institute
- New York Law School library
- New York Medical College
- New York Normal College library
- New York Port Society Library
- New York Public Library (est.1895)
- New-York Sacred Music Society (est.1823)
- New York Society Library
- New York State Colonization Society, Omacatl Society

== O ==
- Odd Fellows' Library
- Olivet Library
- Joseph Osborn's circulating library

== P ==
- Parthenon Circulating Library and Reading Room
- Peck Memorial Library
- Players' Club library
- Post grad. med. school and hospital library
- G.B. Powell's Book Store and Circulating Library, 134 Bowery
- Presbyterian Board of Foreign Missions
- Printers' Free Library (est.1823)
- Prison Association library
- Produce Exchange library
- Public School, 14th Ward
- Public School (20th Ward) Library

== R ==
- William Radde's German circulating library
- Railroad Men's Building library
- Riverside Free Library
- Rutgers Female Institute

== S ==
- St. Agnes' Free Library
- St. Barnabas' Free Reading Room
- St. George's Free Circulating Library
- St. John's College library
- St. Luke's Hospital
- St. Mark's Memorial Chapel, free library
- Seamen's library, Pike St.
- Seamen's Friend Society Library
- Spingler Institute (est.1849), Union Square
- John Stagner's circulating library

== T ==
- Teacher's College, Bryson Library
- Trow Directory library

== U ==
- Union Theological Seminary
- University Club Library
- University of the City of New York
- University Settlement library (est.1892)

== W ==
- Webster Free Circulating Library (est.1894)
- Washington Heights Free Library, Amsterdam Ave.
- Washington Institute
- Westermann's German circulating library
- T. Whybrew's circulating library
- Helen Williams' circulating library
- Woman's Library, no.19 Clinton Place
- Women's Free Reading-Room and Library, no.16 Clinton Place
- Women's Medical College of New York
- Workingmen's Free Reading-Room and Library

== Y ==
- YMCA of Greater New York
- YMCA
- YWCA library (est.1870)

== See also ==
- Books in the United States
- Culture of New York City
- List of New York Public Library Branches
- Media in New York City
