= Isaac A. Hopper =

American builder (1851–1912)

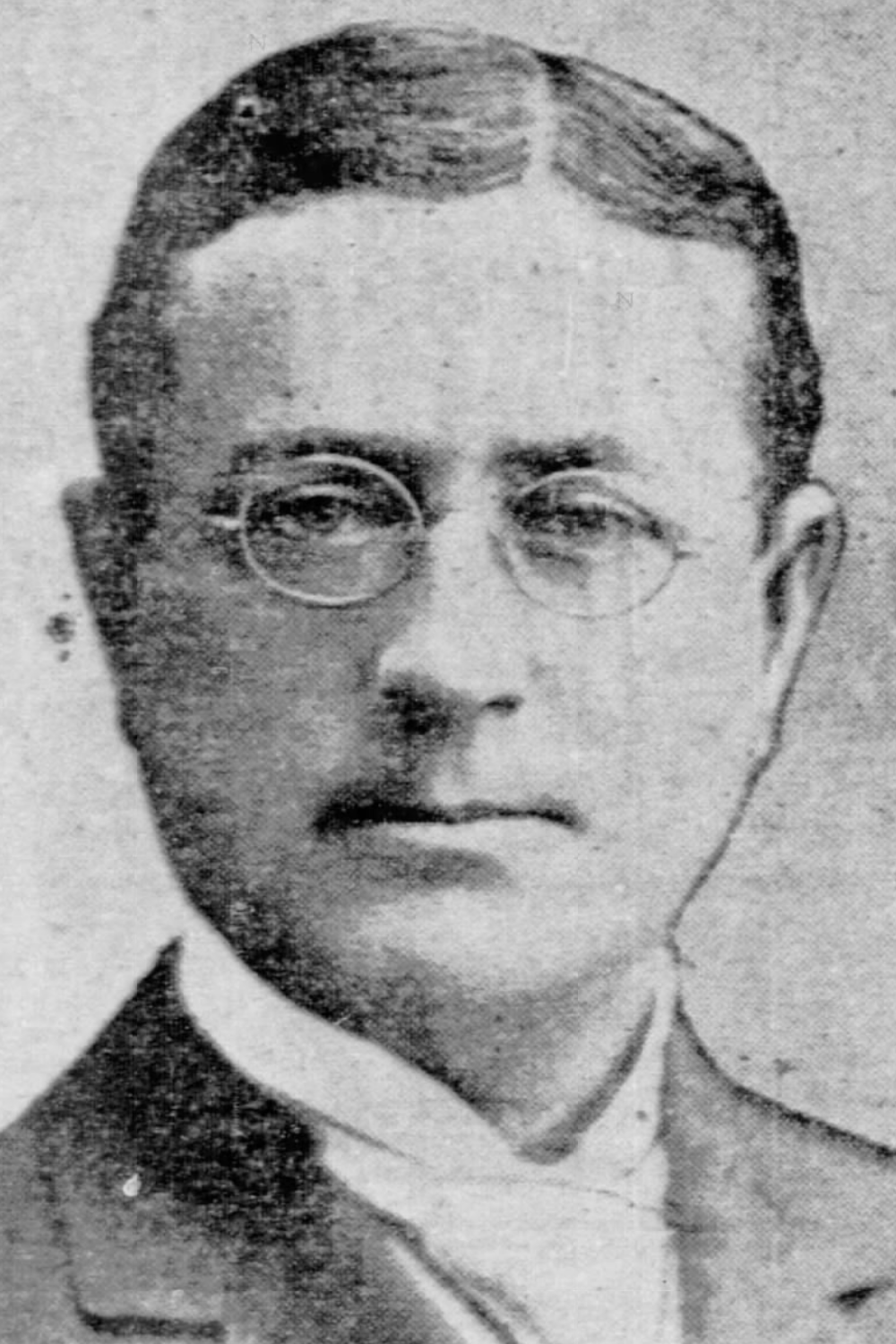
- Hopper, c. 1905
- Born: May 30, 1851; New York City, U.S.
- Died: December 21, 1912 (aged 61); New York City, U.S.
- Occupation: Builder
- Political party: Democratic

Isaac Abraham Hopper (May 30, 1851 – December 21, 1912) was an American builder and politician. He was active in Democratic politics and a member of Tammany Hall in New York. He served as the city's Superintendent of Buildings, and was involved in several scandals related to that position. As a businessman, he ran a construction company which built several major structures including the Third Avenue Bridge and Carnegie Hall.

== Personal life ==
Hopper was born in the Hopper family home on McComb's Dam Road and 151st Street in the Harlem neighborhood of New York City on May 30, 1851, to Abraham Isaac Hopper and Mary Teresa Tone Hopper. His father was also a builder, as was his grandfather, Isaak Abram Hopper.

Hopper attended public schools and the College of the City of New York until he was 15 years old. After his schooling, Hopper moved to New Jersey where he lived for about nine years, returning to New York in 1875 after his father died. He and his wife, Mary C. Hopper, had four sons. One of the sons, Thomas T. Hopper, also went into the building trade. A brother, John J. Hopper, was an engineering contractor.

== Politics ==
Hopper was a Democrat, frequenting the Harlem Democratic Club (where he was their first President), the Lexington Club, the Massasoit Club, the Occidental Club, and the Sagamore Club. He was a member of Tammany Hall, joining in 1893, and a founding member of the Committee of One Hundred, a non-partisan group dedicated to fiscal reform and improvements to the city's transit, education, and parks systems.

He served on the Board of Education and in 1904 was appointed the Superintendent of the Buildings by Mayor George McClellan.

In February 1905, Hopper was the subject of controversy when it was reported that the New York City Board of City Record was paying a newspaper owned by Hopper, The Harlem Local and Bronx Chronicle, a large amount of money to publish official notices, which was a conflict of interest with Hopper's position as the Superintendent of Buildings. The board included the mayor, the controller, and the corporation council. The controller, Edward Marshall Grout, said that he was unaware that the paper was owned by Hopper and when he was informed of this, gave instructions not to make any further payments to the paper. Hopper's political career ended in 1905, following his resignation from that position.

In April 1905, charges were brought against Hopper of incompetency, favoritism, oppression, persecution, and "several other irregularities". He was accused by Herbert S. Renton of Brooklyn. Renton, who sold plumbing supplies, claimed that Hopper required plumbers to use a specific type of floor flange fitting which competed with one which Renton was selling.

== Career ==
Hopper ran a construction business, Isaac A. Hopper & Co, with his partner James Kelly Jr. The firm was located at 200 West 124th Street. Major construction projects included the Third Avenue Bridge, the New Netherlands Hotel, the Emigrant Industrial Savings Bank, Carnegie Music Hall, and the Normandie Hotel. He built several projects for New York Railroads, including a portion of the New York Central Railroad's viaduct, and powerhouses for the Third Avenue Railroad and the New York Central.

Hopper won a $369,610 (equivalent to $11,400,000 in 2024) contract to build the foundation of the New York Custom House in 1900. Although his was the lowest bid, there was some controversy about which bid to accept because a competing bid proposed to do the work in two months less.

He was president of the Empire City Savings Bank located at 231 West 126th Street.

== Death ==
Suffering from heart disease in his final two years and reportedly nearing death by May 1910, Hopper died from the aforementioned disease on December 21, 1912, at the age of 61, in his home at 165 West 122nd Street. Services were held on December 24 at St. Joseph's Church in Harlem with interment at St. Raymond's Cemetery in the Bronx. Hopper's wife Mary was the beneficiary of a $10,000 (equivalent to $230,000 in 2024) bequest in Hopper's will. A year after Hopper's death, the status of the bequest was in question due to a pending $172,000 (equivalent to $4,000,000 in 2024) lawsuit against the estate.

By 1916, the firm of Isaac A. Hopper & Co. had been dissolved and a new firm named Isaac A. Hopper's Sons, Inc. was incorporated. Walter F. Hopper and George B. Hopper were the president and secretary respectively and Sigmund H. Spritz was the vice-president.
