= Hotel Normandie (New York City) =

Luxury hotel (1884–1926)

Coordinates: 40°45′9.5″N 73°59′13.5″W

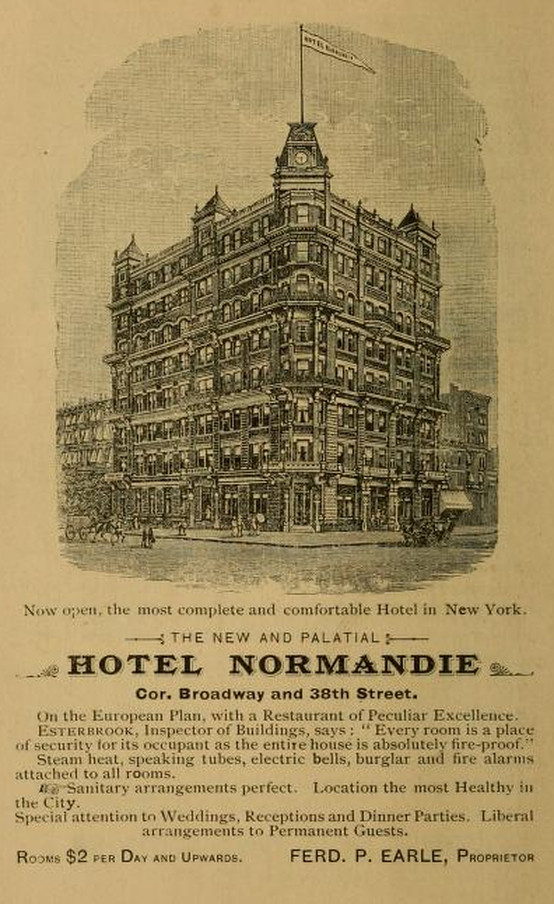
- Interactive map of the Hotel Normandie area

General information
- Location: Broadway and 38th St, New York City
- Demolished: c. 1926

Technical details
- Floor count: 8

The Hotel Normandie was a luxury hotel located on Broadway at 38th Street in New York City. The 8-story building was put up by Ferdinand Earl, an heir of the Fisher family, opening in 1884. Amenities were advertised to include "Steam heat, speaking tubes, electric bells, burglar and fire alarms attached to all rooms". Rooms rates started at $2/day. Dinner was available for $1.25 additional; a quart bottle of Moët & Chandon champagne was $4.

The Leaders of the World electric sign was built on the roof of the hotel in 1910. The sign featured a chariot race scene.

== Construction ==
The hotel was designed by William H. Hume and built by Isaac A. Hopper.

The hotel advertised itself as "absolutely fireproof" with steel beam construction and brick floor arches. In 1894 the hotel suffered a chimney fire but by the time the fire engines arrived the blaze had been extinguished and caused no damage.

On July 16, 1887, there was a major fire in the middle of the night at the adjoining Metropolitan Van and Storage Company. That property was completely destroyed by the fire, but the Normandie suffered only minor damage, with some cracked windows and a burned awning. The hotel guests were woken up, but the building was not evacuated.

In 1910 a large electric sign was erected on the roof of the hotel. The sign featured a chariot race and advertising text and it was referred to as the Leaders of the World.

== Famous occupants and notable events ==
The composer Pyotr Ilyich Tchaikovsky stayed at the Normandie when he visited America in 1891 for the opening of Carnegie Hall. British explorer Kate Marsden stayed at the hotel in 1901.

In Dashiell Hammett's novel The Thin Man, Nick and Nora Charles stayed in a fictional Hotel Normandie, but this was probably not intended to be the same hotel.

On July 15, 1897, at the Hotel Normandie, a meeting of the representatives of several Flag Committees of U.S. states and patriotic societies was held and a decision made to form the American Flag Association with steps taken to that end so that in February 18, 1898, the formal organization was completed.

== Conversion to other uses ==
On August 27, 1907, it was reported that a deal had been struck to lease the building to Henry Corn with a 21-year lease worth $1,000,000 over its lifetime. Corn intended to convert the hotel into retail, office, and loft space after a $150,000 renovation. The deal fell through and a new deal reported on June 25, 1908, put the building under the control of Horace S. Ely & Co and Francis B. Robert. The term was also 21 years, but reported to be worth only about $750,000. Ely and Robert likewise intended to convert the hotel to retail and office space. On September 2, 1908, a deal was announced to lease the top seven floors of the building for $700,000 (again for 21 years), with the space to be renovated into a "first-class commercial hotel".

The building was sold to A. E. Lefcourt in 1926, with plans to build a commercial property on the site. The new building was named the Lefcourt-Normandie Building. In 1928, it was announced that a new bank, named the Normandie National Bank, had been chartered and would open in the building which was at that time still under construction.
