= American Flag Association =

President Hoover receives regional winners in the flag essay contest conducted by the United States Flag Association (1929)

American Flag Association (AFA; later, United States Flag Association) was an American vexillological society of individual members, and also a union of flag committees of the patriotic societies of the United States. The object of the AFA was the fostering of public sentiment in favor of honoring the flag of the United States, and preserving it from desecration, and of initiating and forwarding legal measures to prevent such desecration. Planning for the AFA began on July 15, 1897, and was completed on February 18, 1898.

== History ==
A meeting of the representatives of several Flag Committees was held at the Hotel Normandie, New York City, on July 15, 1897, at which meeting it was decided to form this Association and steps taken to that end. Meetings followed in the autumn of that year. The formal organization of the AFA was completed at a mass meeting of all the state-based Flag Committees, held at New York City Hall, February 18, 1898.

The AFA was a union of the Flag Committees of all the patriotic societies in the country, and to the number of about sixty flag committees. These included the Societies of the Sons of the American Revolution, Daughters of the American Revolution, Sons of the Revolution, Daughters of the Revolution, Societies of the Colonial Wars, Societies of the Founders and Patriots of America, Societies of the War of 1812, Grand Army Posts of the Grand Army of the Republic, Commanderies of the Military Order of the Loyal Legion and other patriotic societies. Thus, the AFA united and consolidated the efforts of sixty odd Flag Committees.

It aimed at the fostering of public sentiment in favor of honoring the U.S. flag, and preserving it from desecration. It also sought to coordinate the efforts of all the Flag Committees and its other members, to enable all to cooperate in the common cause.

It was not claimed that this Association was the pioneer in the work on which it is engaged. But the first successful work of obtaining legislation was done by the AFA and by the Flag Committees of which it was composed, and the Association has secured legislation to that end, in Maine (1899), New Hampshire (1899), Vermont (1898), Massachusetts (1899), Rhode Island (1903), Connecticut (1899), New York (1905), New Jersey (1904), Pennsylvania (1897), Delaware (1903), Maryland (1902), Ohio (1902), Michigan (1901), Indiana (1901), Illinois (1899), Wisconsin (1901), Minnesota (1899), South Dakota (1901), North Dakota (1901), Montana (1905), Wyoming (1905), Idaho (1905), Iowa (1900), Missouri (1903), Kansas (1905), Nebraska (1903), Colorado (1901), Utah (1903), Arizona (1899), California (1899), Oregon (1901), Washington (1904), Porto Rico (1904), and Nevada (1907).

The government of the U.S. had also forbidden the use of the Flag in registration of trade marks. The Supreme Court in February 1907, affirmed the constitutionality of Flag legislation by the different States, and the right to make criminal all acts of desecration of the Flag.

The objects sought invited the work of every Patriotic Society and individual. Any patriotic citizen could become a member of the AFA. Patriotic Societies not yet in the AFA were invited to appoint Flag Committees of thirteen members, more or less, and to apply to the executive committee or to the Association for admission in accordance with the Plan of Organization.

The motto was: "One Flag, One Country, God Over All".

By 1910, the Association had circulated widely its suggested salute to the flag for schools.

The AFA changed its name to the United States Flag Association (USFA) on April 10, 1924. The United States Flag Foundation (USFF) was incorporated in Washington, D.C. on December 31, 1942, and took over much of the work that the AFA and USFA had been doing.

== Notable people ==
- Col. Ralph Earl Prime, Yonkers; AFA president, 1897–1911, 1917

== See also ==
- North American Vexillological Association
