= Mutual Reserve Building =

Office building in Manhattan, New York

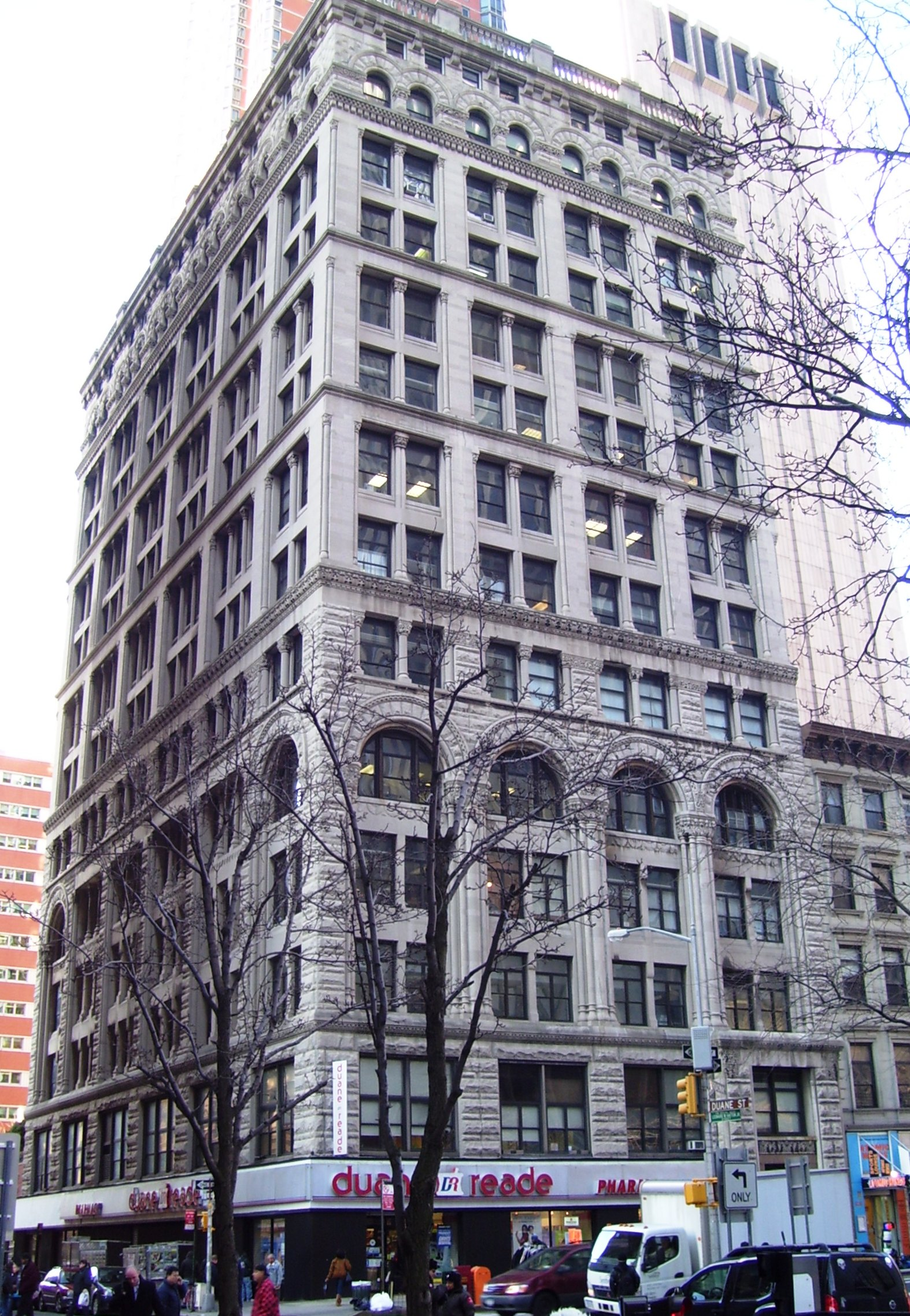
- The eastern facade, seen from Duane Street in 2012
- Interactive map of the Mutual Reserve Building area

General information
- Type: Commercial
- Location: 305 Broadway at NW corner of Duane Street, Manhattan, New York
- Coordinates: 40°42′56″N 74°00′20″W
- Construction started: 1892
- Completed: 1894

Height
- Roof: 184 ft (56 m)

Technical details
- Floor count: 13

Design and construction
- Architect: William H. Hume
- Structural engineer: Frederick H. Kindl
- Main contractor: Richard Deeves & Son

New York City Landmark
- Designated: December 20, 2011
- Reference no.: 2431

The Mutual Reserve Building, also known as the Langdon Building and 305 Broadway, is an office building at Broadway and Duane Street in the Tribeca neighborhood of Manhattan in New York City. The 13-story building, constructed between 1892 and 1894, was designed by William H. Hume and built by Richard Deeves, with Frederick H. Kindl as chief structural engineer. It is just east of the Civic Center of Manhattan, and carries the addresses 305–309 Broadway and 91–99 Duane Street.

The Mutual Reserve Building was designed in a variant of the Romanesque Revival style inspired by the work of Henry Hobson Richardson. The building's articulation consists of three horizontal sections similar to the components of a column, namely a base, shaft, and capital. The facade is clad with granite and limestone, and includes arcades on its lower and upper stories, piers made of rusticated stone blocks, and decorative foliate motifs. The structure was one of the first in New York City to use a cage-like steel frame structure, an early version of the skyscraper.

The Mutual Reserve Building was originally named for its main tenant, the Mutual Reserve Fund Life Association, and owned by the family of shipping magnate William Fletcher Weld. After the Mutual Reserve Association went bankrupt in 1909, 305 Broadway was renamed the Langdon Building, after the son of the owner. The Weld family sold the building in 1920, and through the rest of the century, the building's main tenants were in the publishing and paper industries, and it also served as the New York City Landmarks Preservation Commission's first long-term headquarters from 1967 to 1980. The Mutual Reserve Building is one of several extant life-insurance buildings on the southernmost section of Broadway, and was designated a New York City landmark in 2011.

== Site ==
The Mutual Reserve Building is in the Tribeca neighborhood of Manhattan, just west of the Civic Center. It has frontage along Broadway to the east and Duane Street to the south. Nearby buildings and locations include the David S. Brown Store to the northwest; 311 Broadway and 315 Broadway to the north; the Jacob K. Javits Federal Building to the east; and the Ted Weiss Federal Building and African Burial Ground National Monument to the southeast. The building spans the addresses 305–309 Broadway and 91–99 Duane Street. The lot measures 75 by 122 feet (23 by 37 m), with the longer side being on Duane Street.

== Architecture ==
The Mutual Reserve Building is 13 stories tall, with a roof height of 184 feet (56 m). It was designed by William H. Hume in a variant of the Romanesque Revival style inspired by the work of Henry Hobson Richardson. Richard Deeves was also involved as the main builder, Frederick H. Kindl was the chief structural engineer, Carnegie Steel Company was the steel supplier, and Hanlein & Co. was the stone contractor.

The design was inspired by that of R. H. Robertson's Lincoln Building at Union Square. Both structures used the Richardson Romanesque style, specifically multi-story round-arched arcades upon a stone facade. The design also had smaller cornices above the 6th, 8th, and 10th floors.

=== Facade ===
The eastern and southern facades are clad in limestone and divided into three horizontal sections: a base and shaft of six stories each, as well as a one-story capital. Small cornices run above the 6th, 8th, 10th, and 12th floors. The northern and western facades are faced in plain brick, with window openings.

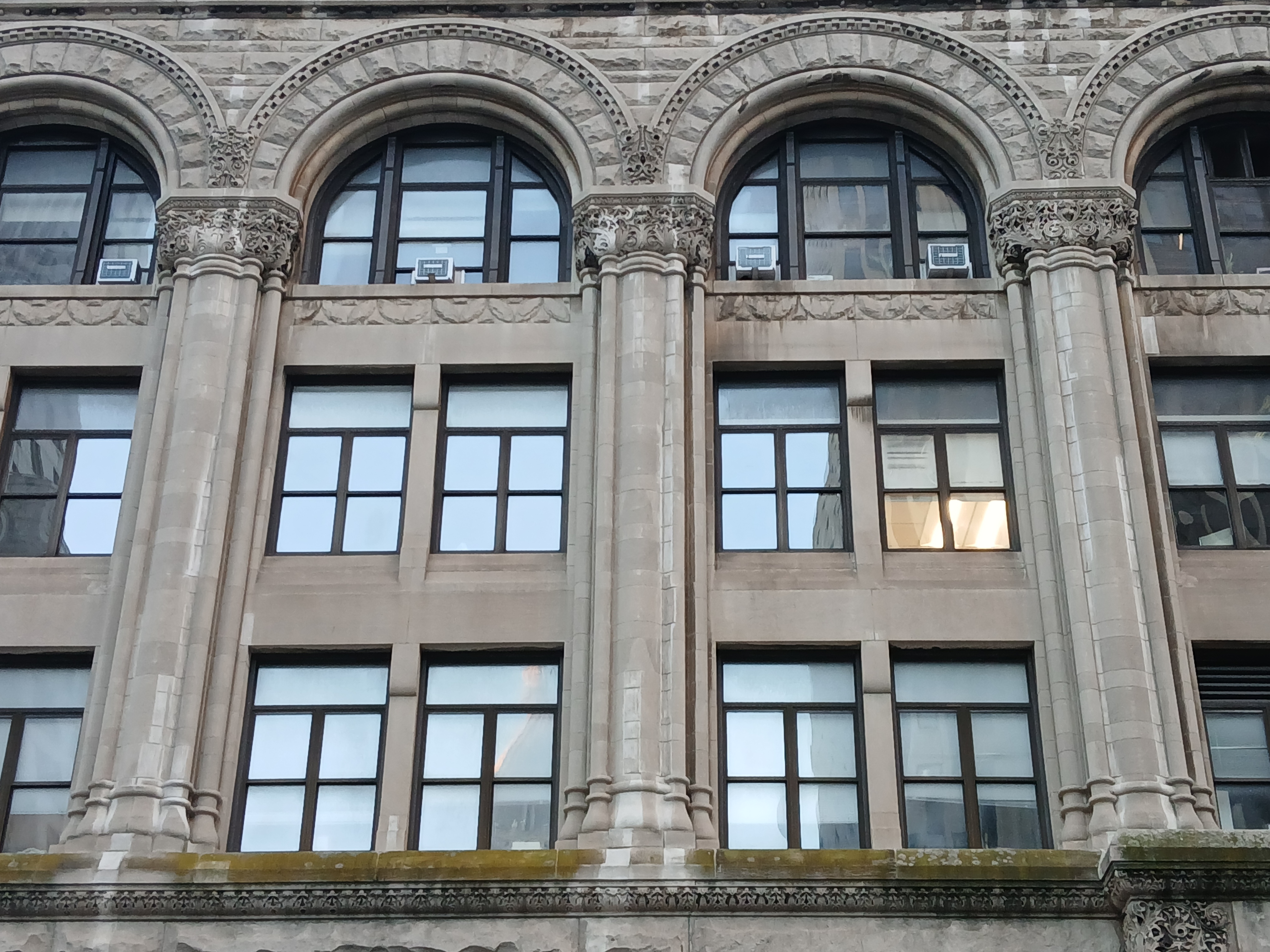
Detail on lower stories

The building is split vertically into four bays on Broadway and six on Duane Street. The lowest five stories contain round-arched arcades supported by rusticated stone piers. The arches are located on the Broadway facade, as well as the outermost bays along Duane Street. These bays contain two rectangular windows on each floor, both within and above the arches. The center bays on Duane Street contain three windows on each floor. The top story is also arranged as a small arcade with arched windows. The top story runs below a parapet with a balustrade. As built, the entrance on Broadway contained a large arch, but this was eliminated in 1923.

=== Features ===
The structure was one of the first early skyscrapers in New York City to use a cage-like steel frame structure. The Mutual Reserve Building utilized steel in its beams and columns, which were riveted to each other and supported each floor's walls. In 1909, during a meeting of the Institution of Civil Engineers, Carnegie Steel engineer C. V. Childs stated that he had devised a wind bracing system, using gusset plates at the building's narrow end to reduce distortion; this system was first used in either the Mutual Reserve Building or the Savoy-Plaza Hotel. The developers of the American Surety Building, another early skyscraper with a full steel skeleton completed in 1896, intended to model their project after the Mutual Reserve Building's design.

The steel frame was encased in brick and asbestos cement. The building was described in The New York Times as being "absolutely fireproof", with brick partitions and floors. Inside, the staircases were made of iron and stone, and the hallways were finished in marble. When opened, the building contained a mail chute and an electric clock on every floor. As originally built, wood was only used for furniture, doors, and the casement windows.

The basement housed the building's lighting, housing, and ventilation machinery, as well as an employee dining room and storage space. The first floor is reserved for retail space, and was placed at ground level, as opposed to earlier buildings that had a raised basement for their first-floor tenants. The first-floor vestibules were made of marble. The upper floors were mostly used as office space; the Mutual Reserve Association utilized three or four of the lowest office stories, (Note: The New York City Landmarks Preservation Commission says that the 2nd through 4th floors were used. However, local newspaper Tribeca Citizen and the New-York Tribune state that Mutual Reserve occupied the 2nd through 5th floors.) while the other floors were rented to other tenants. Early advertisements also touted a barber shop, cigar stand, ticket office, and telegraph and telephone offices.

Four Otis & Brother elevators were used in the Mutual Reserve Building when it opened. One of the building's elevators, running from the 1st through 5th floors, was used solely by Mutual Reserve's top-level executives until it was sealed in 1907. As in other early skyscrapers of the time, the elevator doors on each door could be opened regardless of where the elevator physically was. The building's elevators were involved in at least three deaths: a businessman in 1904, a delicatessen dealer in 1909, and a cleaner in 1926.

== History ==
=== Planning and construction ===
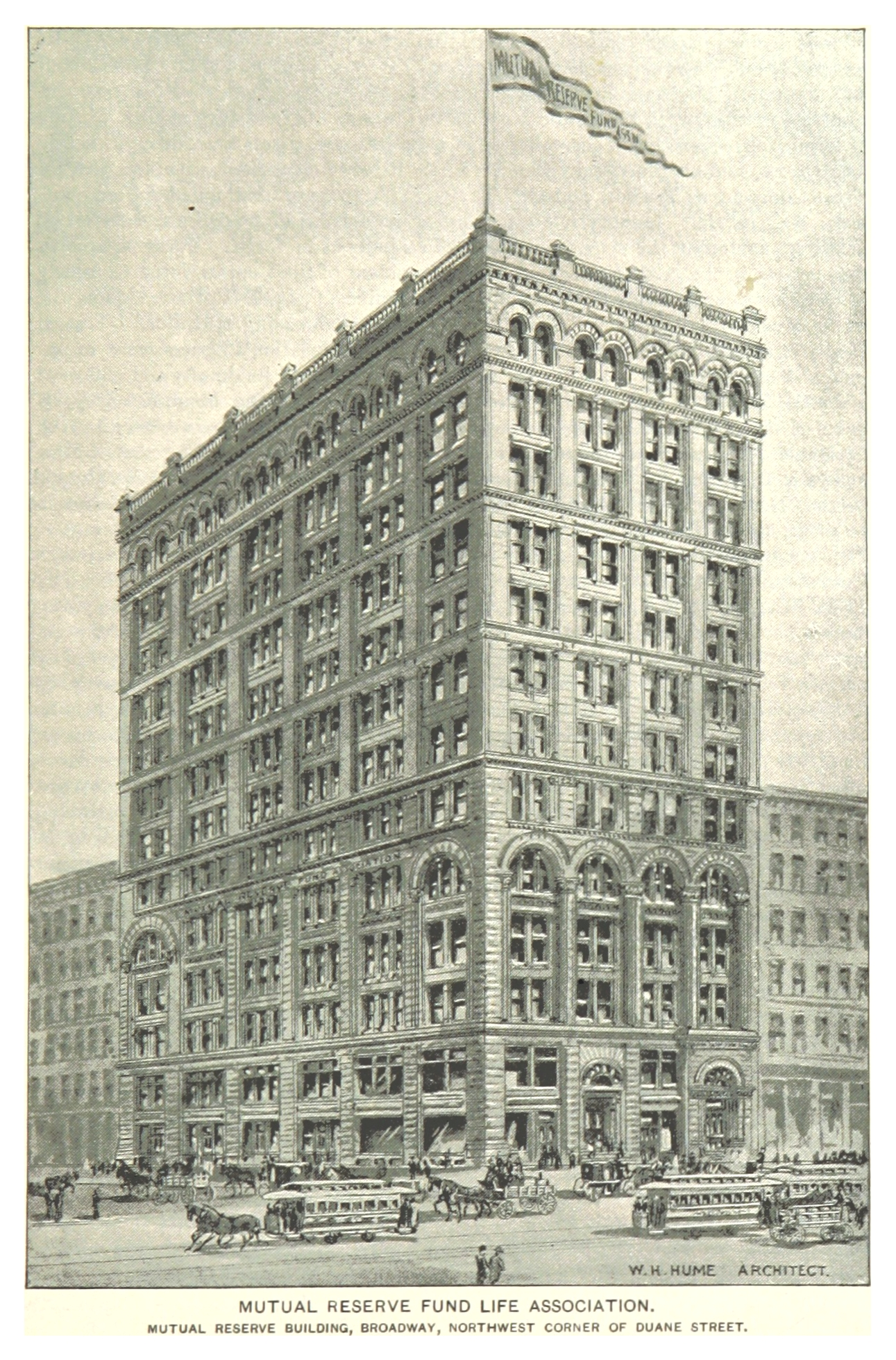
Depicted in King's Handbook of New York City (1893)

William Fletcher Weld, who died in 1881, was described as one of the most successful merchant ship owners in the United States. He left a $21 million estate (equivalent to $586 million in 2024), much of which went to his grandchildren William Fletcher Weld Jr., Charles Goddard Weld, Mary Bryant Pratt Sprague, and Isabel Weld Perkins. The Weld estate bought the northwest-corner lot at Broadway and Duane Street from the Hale estate in May 1888 for $350,000. At the time, the lot contained a three-story brick building with a restaurant on the ground floor and offices on the upper floors. Two years later, the estate acquired an interior lot adjacent to that property. In January 1892, the Real Estate Record and Guide reported that Hume had been contracted to design a building of at least 10 stories on the Weld estate's lot, which would be constructed for at least $600,000.

The Mutual Reserve Fund Life Association was launched as a life insurance company in 1881 under the leadership of Edward Bascom Harper. Within eleven years, it had become the world's "purely mutual natural-premium" life insurance company. By the time the building was announced in January 1892, Mutual Reserve had agreed to lease space in the Weld estate's new building for its new headquarters. The lease would run 40 years from June 1, 1894, and was based on a percentage of the construction cost and the $500,000 land value. Mutual Reserve was recorded as having paid $408,297 for the lease, as well as construction and furnishings.

Hume filed plans for the Mutual Reserve Building in June 1892, by which it was planned as a 13-story structure. Work was delayed due to a strike at Carnegie Steel's factories. Construction was also held up by strikes at the granite supplier's factory. Mutual Reserve, in a January 1894 report, stated that the building would be completed by the next month. The ground-floor retail spaces had been leased for $30,000 annually, while the upper floors had been leased to several tenants for a combined $75,000 annually. On June 14, 1894, two hundred guests and Mutual Reserve employees attended dedication ceremonies on the building's roof. The building, officially completed in September, ultimately cost $1.2 million in total.

=== Use ===
==== Late 19th and early 20th centuries ====
After the Mutual Reserve Building's completion. Mutual Reserve vacated its former quarters at the Potter Building on nearby Park Row. The company's presidential and cabinet offices were on the 4th floor, while the general offices were on the 2nd floor. The Arkwright Club, a merchants' clubhouse, leased space on the 13th floor for $60,000 annually between 1893 and 1895. In the first two decades of the Mutual Reserve Building's existence, it contained the offices of several tenants involved in the paper and publishing industry. Additional tenants included the Co-Operative Building Bank, the Spanish Benevolent Society of New York, the Mutual Mercantile Agency, the Miller Bros Cutlery Company, and a "National Organization of Brain Brokers" named Hapgoods. The building's contractor Richard Deeves & Son, as well as a bicycle showroom and architects, also took up space in the building. The Weld estate retained ownership of the building, although William Jr. died in 1893 and Charles and Isabel gave up their respective shares in 1901 and 1907.

The Mutual Reserve Association experienced controversy in 1896 over allegations of financial mismanagement, and reorganized as the Mutual Reserve Life Insurance Company in 1902, although further scrutiny led to the company's vice-president and president being indicted in 1906. In the wake of this controversy, the building's private executives' elevator was closed in June 1907. Mutual Reserve renewed its lease at the Mutual Reserve Building in February 1908 for $60,000 annually, even though the company had just entered receivership. 305 Broadway had become known as the Langdon Building by 1909, when Hume filed plans for minor building modifications. The building was probably named after John Langdon Brandegee, a stock broker who was the son of the sole owner at the time, Mary Bryant Pratt Sprague. The Mutual Reserve Company had become bankrupt by 1911. During the mid-1910s, the ground floor space was taken by the Standard Lunch Company and Emerson Shoe Company.

==== Mid-20th century to present ====
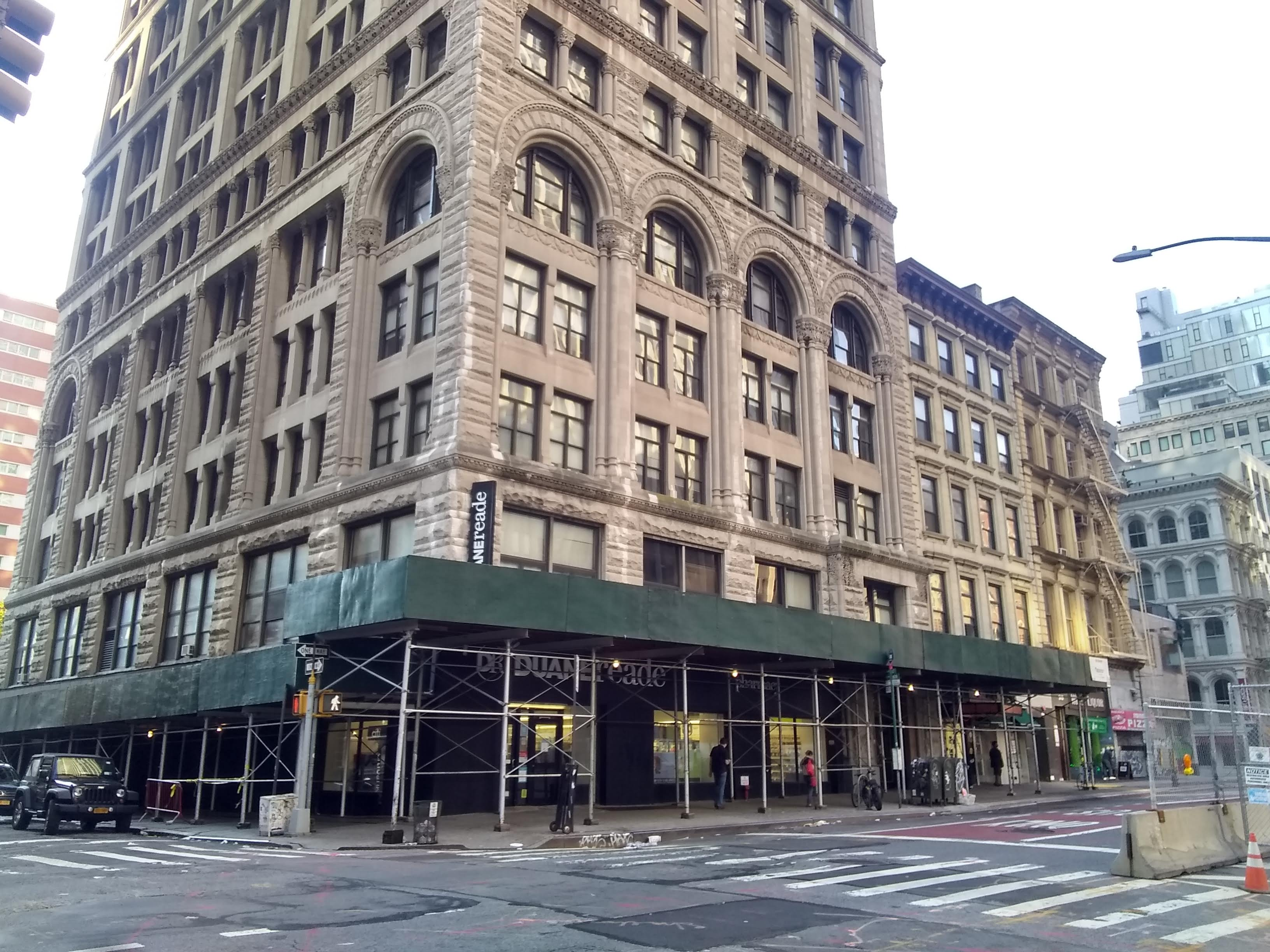
The lower stories, as seen from Broadway and Duane Street in 2020

In February 1920, the Broadway-John Street Corporation bought the Langdon Building from the Weld estate for about $2 million. The new owner planned to renovate the building for lawyers' use at a cost of $40,000 to $50,000, and planned to rename the structure as the Lawyers' Building. The purchase was due to the building's proximity to courthouses on Chambers Street and the lack of available space for lawyers in the Financial District. In 1923, architects Schwartz & Gross were hired to replace the large entrance arch on Broadway with a "squared-off" opening. The Mutual Reserve Building was not highly regarded in the legal sector, being described as "a law office slum" and a 1920s hub of the "personal injury underworld". Other tenants during that time included metal supplier Herman J. Heght Inc.; the Amalgamated Lithographers of America; architecture firm Marcus Contracting Company; architect George F. Hardy; and a temporary location of the Wall Street Synagogue.

The building was sold in 1940 to the Downtown Renting Company, and it was refinanced for $300,000. At the time, 305 Broadway was entirely rented, with most of the tenants being lawyers. Five years later, the building was sold to Broaduane Corporation. The Jewish Forum Association, which published a journal called the Jewish Forum, operated in the building in the 1940s. During the next decade, many agencies of the New York state government started moving in. The 305 Broadway Company, headed by Sylvan Lawrence and Seymour Cohn, bought the building in 1957. Two years later, 305 Broadway was sold again to Joseph and Louis Lefkowitz of Broadway Duane Associates, who leased the building back to the previous owners. After purchase, Louis Lefkowitz changed the name of 305 Broadway from the Broadway Duane Building to the Lawyers Equity Building.

Through the 1960s, the city government's departments of Real Estate and Relocation also occupied space in 305 Broadway. The building also served as the first permanent headquarters of the New York City Landmarks Preservation Commission (LPC) from 1967 to 1980. The building's leasehold was given to 305 Broadway Corporation, headed by Louis Lefkowitz, in 1969. The leasehold and property fee were united in 1975 under the 305 Broadway Company. In 1980, Herman Abbott bought the then-vacant building, intending to upgrade it to offices. Reade Broadway Associates bought the building two years later. The LPC scheduled hearings in 1989 for the possibility of conferring city landmark designation upon 305 Broadway. The building officially became a city landmark in 2011. It is one of several remaining life-insurance company headquarters on the southernmost section of Broadway, along with the Former New York Life Insurance Company Building and the Home Life Building.

== Critical reception ==
Moses King, in his 1893 edition of King's Handbook of New York, referred to 305 Broadway as "one of the finest office buildings in the city", describing the building as "a masterpiece of architecture". The same year, the New-York Tribune wrote that the Mutual Reserve Building's design "has aroused the admiration of all who have seen it." The building's fireproof features were inspected in an 1895 visit led by William Hume and managing director G. H. Wooster, leading The New York Times to state that "[m]odern scientific construction can go no further". In the 1897 National Cyclopaedia of American Biography, the Mutual Reserve Building was characterized as "an imperishable monument to the sound judgement and business abilities of" Mutual Reserve president Edward B. Harper. The Tribune, in 1898, described the building's design as being "perfectly" proportioned, and the facade arrangement as being "admirable".
