= Leaders of the World sign =

Former electric advertising sign in New York City

Leaders of the World
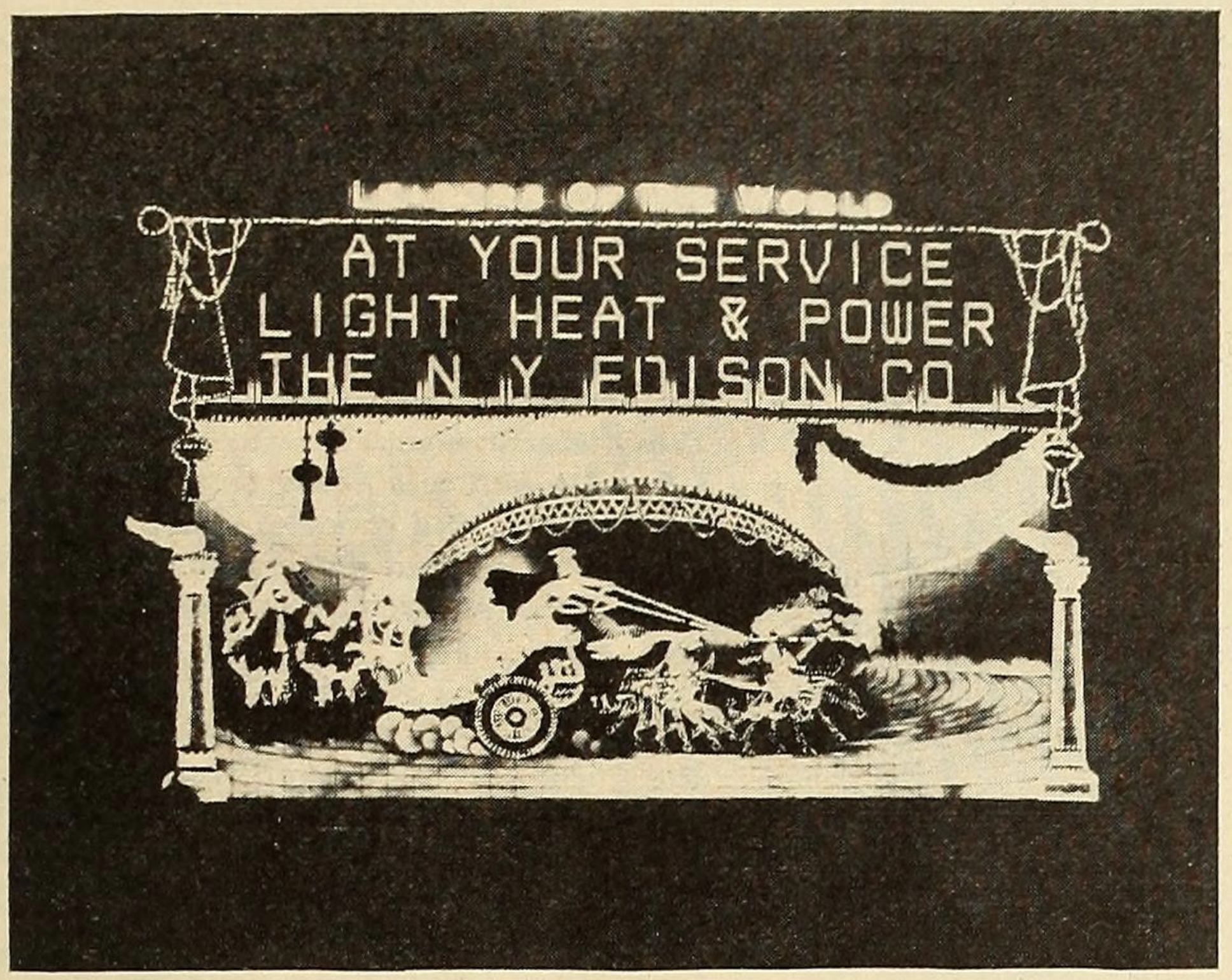
- Completed: July 19, 1910
- Height: 72 ft (22 m)
- Location: Broadway and 38th St, Manhattan, New York City
- Location within Manhattan
- Coordinates: 40°45′09″N 73°59′14″W

Leaders of the World (alternate title: The Fiery Chariot Race in New York) was an electric advertising sign in New York City from 1910 to 1912 and one of the largest in New York City when it was built. It displayed an animated scene of a Roman chariot race along with a text message for the advertiser. The sign began operation on July 19, 1910, and was destroyed in a storm on February 22, 1912.

The sign's manufacturer ran an international contest to solicit marketing ideas. It was not a commercial success, but there were references to it in F. Scott Fitzgerald's writings.

== Construction ==
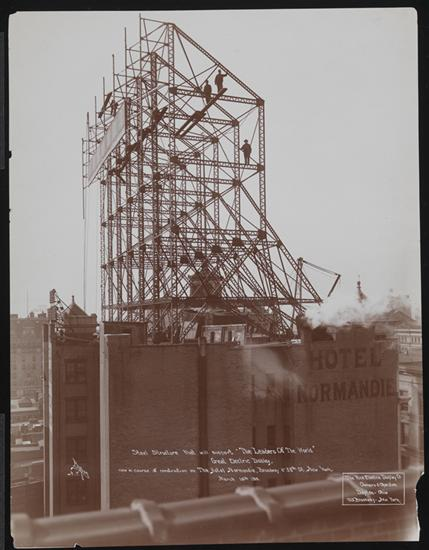
Sign under construction

The sign was erected by the Rice Electric Display Company of Dayton, Ohio, on the roof of the Hotel Normandie, on Broadway and 38th Street, near Herald Square, taking approximately 90 days to complete. This was the third such sign installed. The first one had been erected in Dayton, and a second one in Detroit, Michigan. A smaller version of the sign was later put up in Milwaukee, Wisconsin.

The sign had approximately 20,000 electric light bulbs, used 600 horsepower (450 kW), included more than 95 miles (153 km) of electrical wire, and had 70,000 electrical connections. The supporting structure on which it was mounted included 60 short tons (54 t) of steel. At the time of its construction, it had ten times as many electric bulbs as the next largest electric sign on Broadway. It was constructed off-site and required eight railroad cars to transport the pieces to New York.

The first evening of operation was July 19, 1910, at which it "attracted such a crowd that the police had difficulty in keeping the people in check". At the sign's commissioning, Elwood E. Rice gave a celebration party on the roof of the Marlborough Hotel, two blocks south of the Normandie at 38th street, with a good view of the sign. The party included an orchestra and buffet lunch, and was by invitation only.

== Description ==
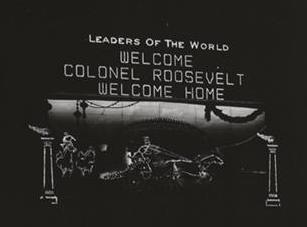
Sign at night

The sign had an animated scene of a Roman chariot race; the action lasted about 30 seconds, with successive performances separated by about 30 seconds of darkness. The legend Leaders of the World appeared at the top of the sign, written in continually illuminated electric bulbs. The scene used a series of flashing lights for the chariots, horses, and drivers moving in one direction, and the stadium audience moving in the opposite direction.

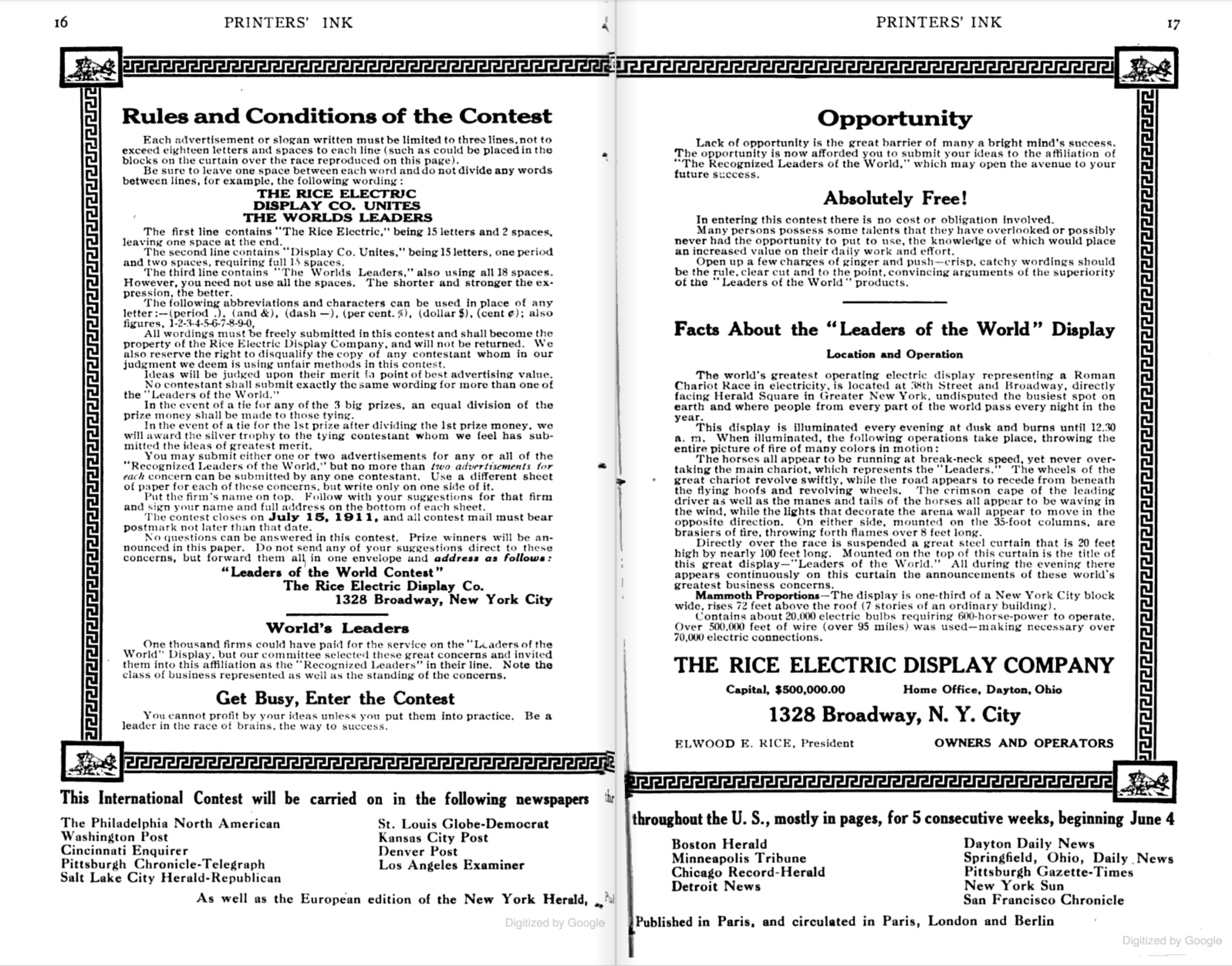
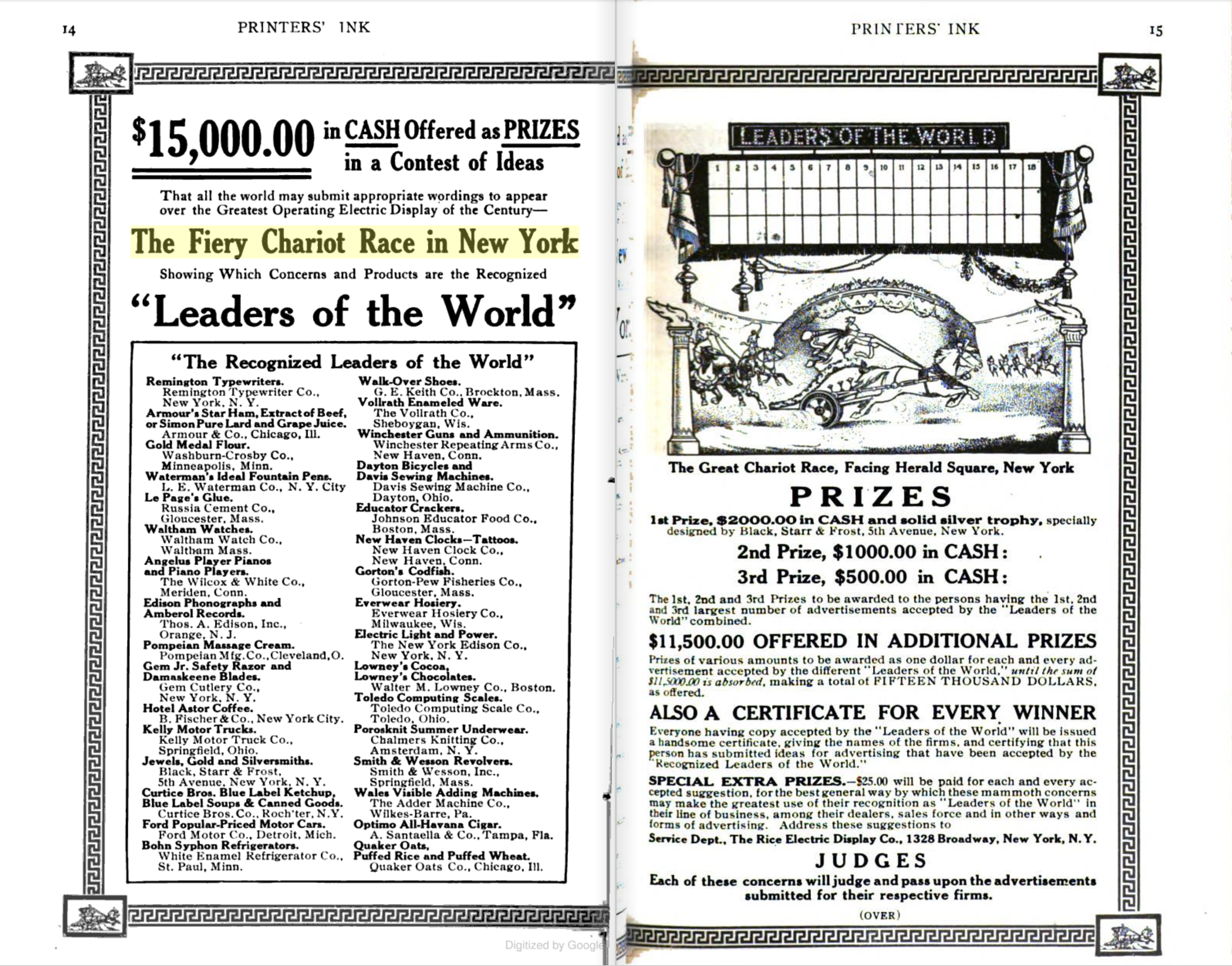
Contest advertisement in the journal Printers' Ink

At the top of the sign was a programmable display capable of showing an advertiser's message in a 3 line by 18 character matrix, with individual characters being 4 feet (1.2 m) tall. In 1911, a contest was held in which people could submit "snappy catch phrases or slogans" that could be used by the sign's advertisers. The contest was publicized in 18 cities including Paris, attracting 500,000 entries that competed for $15,000 in cash prizes. The advertising fee was $500 (equivalent to $17,000 in 2025) per week.

At the time of its construction in 1910, it was one of the largest animated signs built to date, being 72 feet (22 m) tall and 90 feet (27 m) wide. The chariot race scene included horses 20 feet (6.1 m) high by 40 feet (12 m) long, with 8-foot (2.4 m) diameter wheels; these were designed to appear to be normal size when viewed from street level. The incandescent bulbs ranged from 2 to 32 candle power, with another bank of 100W tungsten lamps. Approximately 2750 electrical switches controlled the lights, requiring two 10 horsepower (7.5 kW) motors to operate the switches. The sign included no moving parts; the appearance of motion was created by lights flashing at high speed. For example, one of the horses had 8 sets of lights outlining various positions of their legs, with the illumination changing quickly enough that the human eye perceived continuous motion.

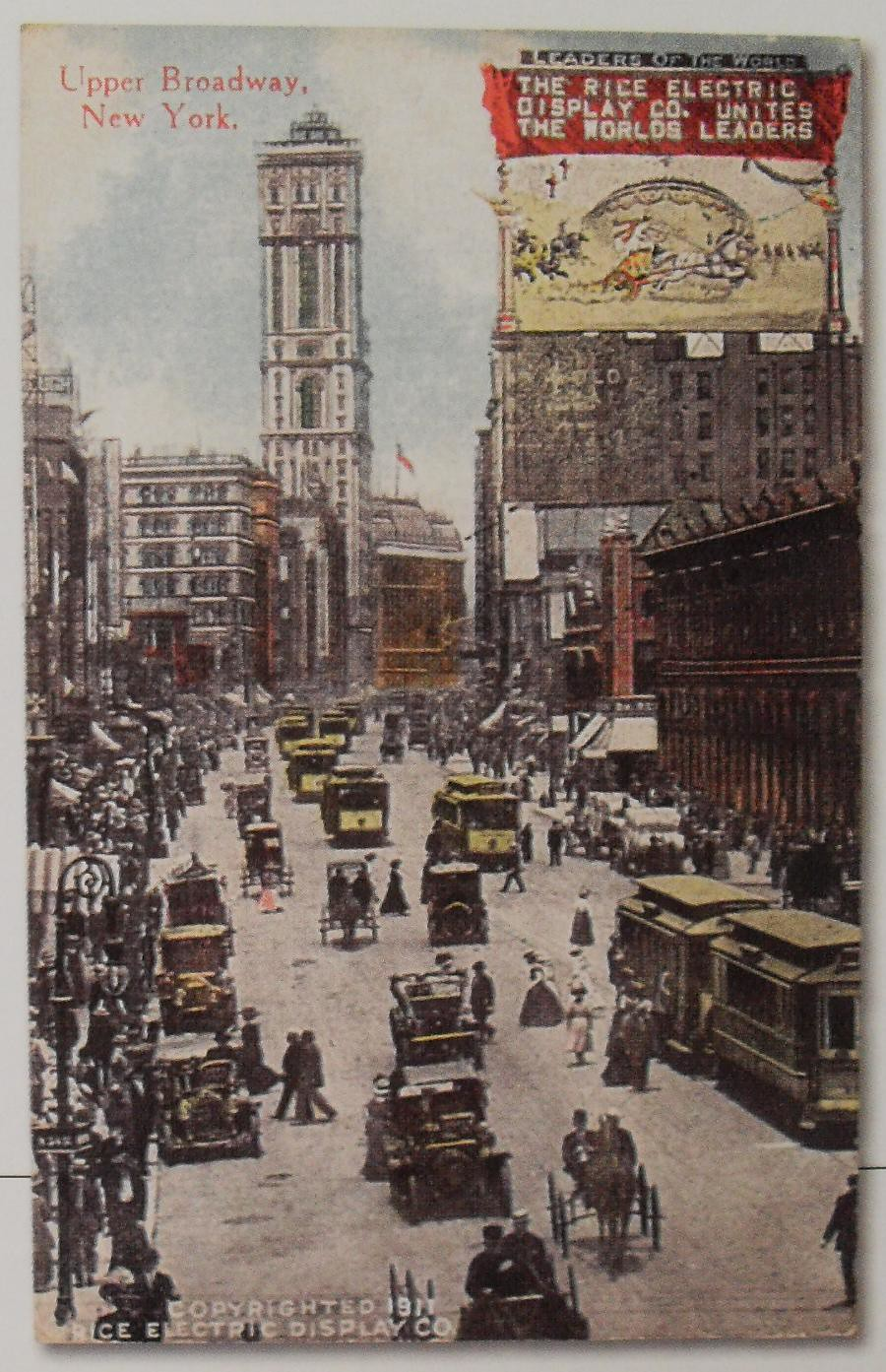
Postcard by Rice Electric Display Company

It is unclear if the sign had an official title. The legend Leaders of the World appeared at the top of the sign, but many sources simply describe it as "the chariot race sign" or something similar. Biographer and academic James L. W. West III states that "the apparatus was formally titled The Fiery Chariot Race in New York", and that it was inspired by Lew Wallace's novel Ben-Hur.

== Aftermath ==
The sign was destroyed in a record-setting storm which hit New York on February 22, 1912. The wind broke it into two pieces, leaving the upper section dangling. Sustained winds as high as 110 miles per hour (180 km/h) were reported. After the damage the Fire Department issued an order to have the rest of the sign taken down. The Monthly Weather Review noted an extreme wind velocity of 120 miles per hour (190 km/h) and commented that "The largest damage was to signs and plate-glass windows." Several other large signs in Manhattan were also damaged by the same storm.

The sign was positioned facing south from 38th street, towards Herald Square. By the time the it was destroyed in the storm, a 12-story building was being built at Broadway and 37th street, which would have obscured the sign from view.

The sign was reportedly a commercial failure, attracting large crowds but performing poorly from an advertising standpoint. Among the items promoted were underwear, alarm clocks, and domestic champagne, but viewers often could not remember these products. In a criticism, it was noted that the sign "attracts attention to itself rather than to the product or the store it is designed to advertise".

== Literary allusion ==
This Side of Paradise (1920), the debut novel of F. Scott Fitzgerald, references the sign in the first chapter, where protagonist Amory Blaine observes New York City at night for the first time, as lit by the sign:

... but this time he saw it by electric light, and romance gleamed from the chariot-race sign on Broadway and from the women's eyes at the Astor, where he and young Paskert from St. Regis' had dinner. When they walked down the aisle of the theatre, greeted by the nervous twanging and discord of untuned violins and the sensuous, heavy fragrance of paint and powder, he moved in a sphere of epicurean delight. Everything enchanted him.

— F. Scott Fitzgerald, This Side of Paradise

As the sign was used as a vehicle for advertising in real life, James West surmises that this allusion serves to foreshadow Amory's employment at an advertising agency later in the story. After Amory's firing from the agency leads to his loss of wealth and status, his girlfriend Rosalind Connage leaves him for a rich man. West wrote that the theme of "authority of money, its power to subvert genuine love and human feeling" is present in all of Fitzgerald's works, and that the sign in the novel was a symbol for commerce. Fitzgerald also mentions the sign in his essay My Lost City:

I had come only to stare at the show, though the designers of the Woolworth Building and the Chariot Race Sign, the producers of musical comedies and the problem plays could ask for no more appreciative spectator, for I took the style and glitter of New York even above its own valuation.

— F. Scott Fitzgerald, My Lost City

== Rice Leaders of the World Association ==
In 1912, Rice formed the Rice Leaders of the World Association. Headquartered in New York, the Association was a group of fifty American manufacturing companies which Rice described as being "for the fostering of high business principles and ideals in industry".
