= Hocquet Caritat =

Louis Alexis Hocquet de Caritat was a French-born bookseller and publisher in New York in the late 18th and early 19th centuries. He operated a rental library and a reading room located in 1802 at "City-Hotel, Fenelon's Head, Broad-Way." He served as the "authorized distributor of Minerva Press books'" in the U. States. He stocked some 30,000 volumes including imported titles in English and French language, and occasionally non-print items such as "sparkling white champaign wine."

One of Caritat's contemporary admirers wrote in 1803:

I would place the bust of Caritat among those of the Sosii of Horace, and the Centryphon of Quintillian. He was my only friend at New-York, when the energies of my mind were depressed by the chilling prospect of poverty. His talents, were not meanly cultivated by letters; he could tell a good book from a bad one, which few modern librarians can do. But place aux dames was his maxim, and all the ladies of New-York declared that the library of Mr. Caritat was charming. Its shelves could scarcely sustain the weight of Female Frailty, the Posthumous Daughter, and the Cavern of Woe; they required the aid of the carpenter to support the burden of the Cottage-on-the-Moor, the House of Tynian, and the Castles of Athlin and Dunbayne; or they groaned under the multiplied editions of the Devil in Love, More Ghosts, and Rinaldo Rinaldini. Novels were called for by the young and the old; from the tender virgin of thirteen, whose little heart went pit-a-pat at the approach of a beau; to the experienced matron of three score, who could not read without spectacles.

== See also ==
- Books in the United States
