= 15 Union Square West =

Residential building in Manhattan, New York

Coordinates: 40°44′09″N 73°59′30″W

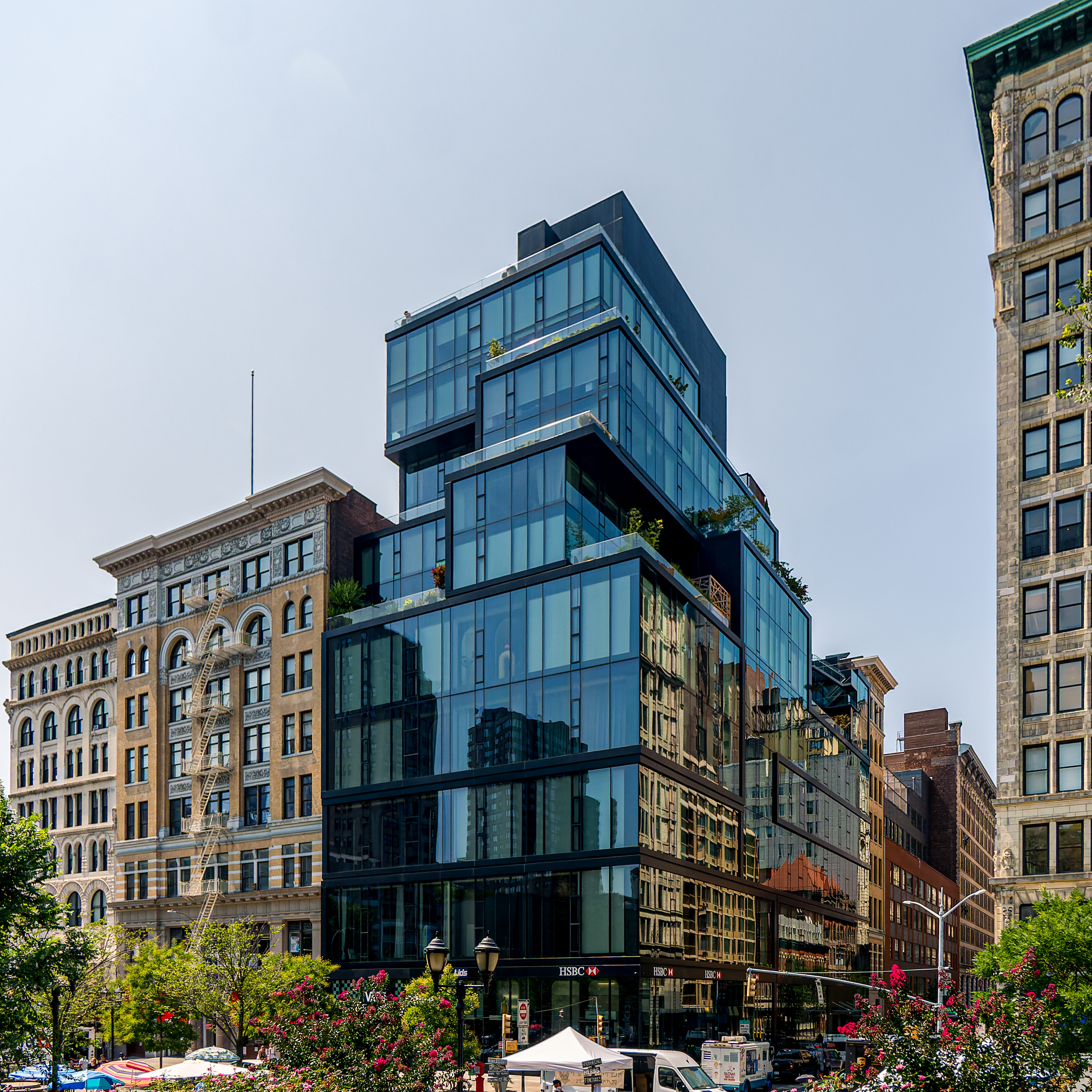
15 Union Square West in 2021

15 Union Square West is a residential building on East 15th Street overlooking Union Square in Manhattan, New York City. Originally Tiffany & Company’s 19th-century headquarters, it was refurbished and reopened in 2008 as high-end apartments.

Commissioned by Charles Lewis Tiffany in 1869, John Kellum designed the original structure, which included 16-foot cast-iron arches that rose above the park. The building cost $500,000 and opened in 1870. At the time, the store was described as “the largest of its kind devoted to this business of any in the world,” and dubbed the “palace of jewels”. Tiffany & Co. stayed there until 1906. By 1925 the building was occupied by the Amalgamated Clothing Workers of America trade union.

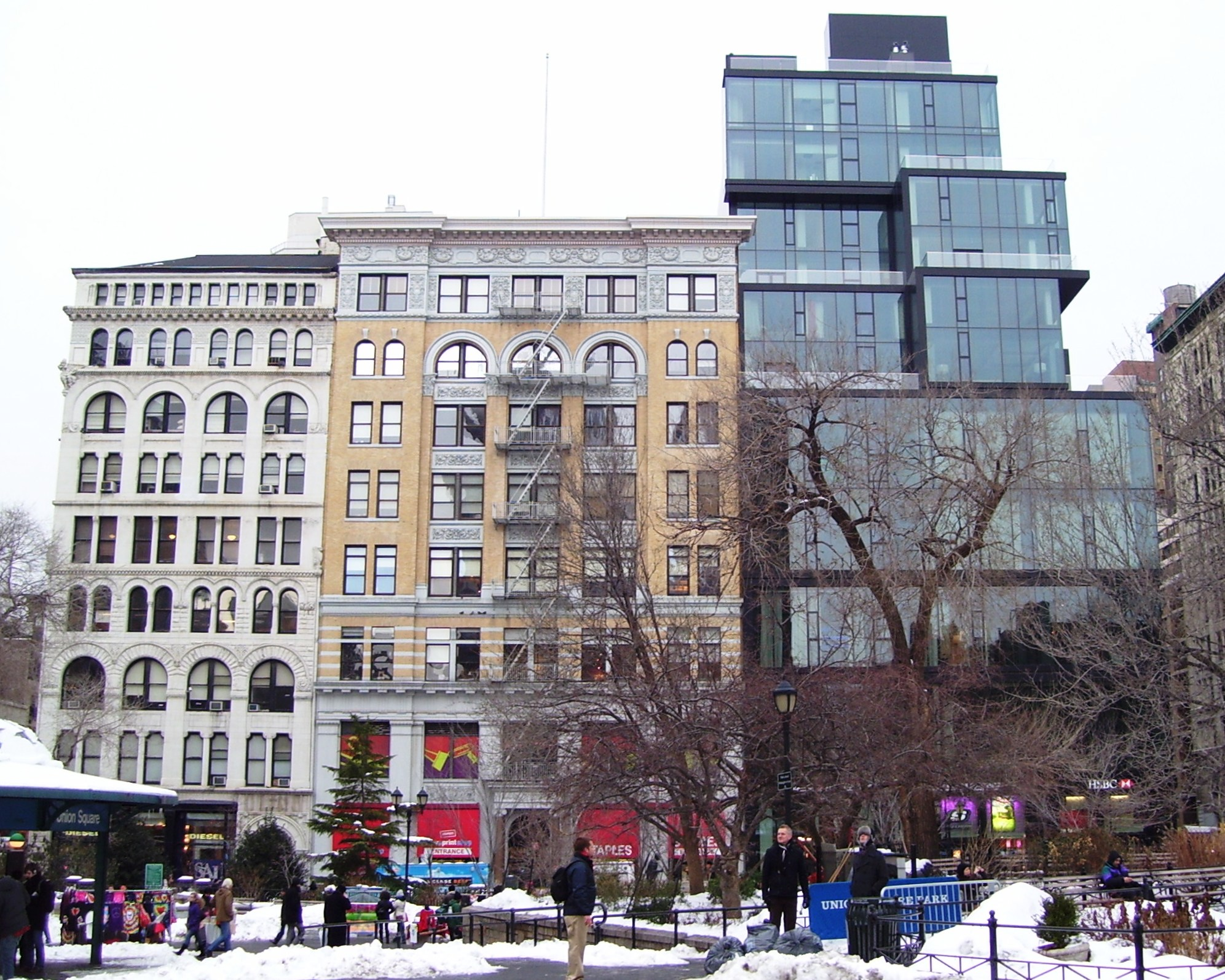
Viewed from Union Square. Left to right: Lincoln Building, Spingler Building, 15 Union Square West

By 1952 it was owned by Amalgamated Bank. After a fatal accident where a pedestrian was struck by a falling piece of cast iron, they stripped the original façade and covered it with white brick. The building then stood unchanged for more than 50 years.

Brack Capital Real Estate purchased the property in 2006, and restored the original six-story structure and added six newly constructed floors to create a boutique condominium with 36 residences. The brick façade was dismantled and the original arches were reconditioned and wrapped behind a façade of glass and black anodized aluminum. The original structure was topped by an additional six stories of all glass residences. Designed by Eran Chen of ODA-Architecture, previously of Perkins Eastman, the building blends historic and contemporary elements.

In 2011, two of the two-bedroom apartments were purchased by tennis player Caroline Wozniacki for $9 million. Earlier that year, the retail portion of the development was purchased by the State Teachers Retirement System of Ohio (STRS) for $57.88 million.
