= Spingler Building =

Building in Manhattan, New York

Coordinates: 40.735653°N 73.991679°W

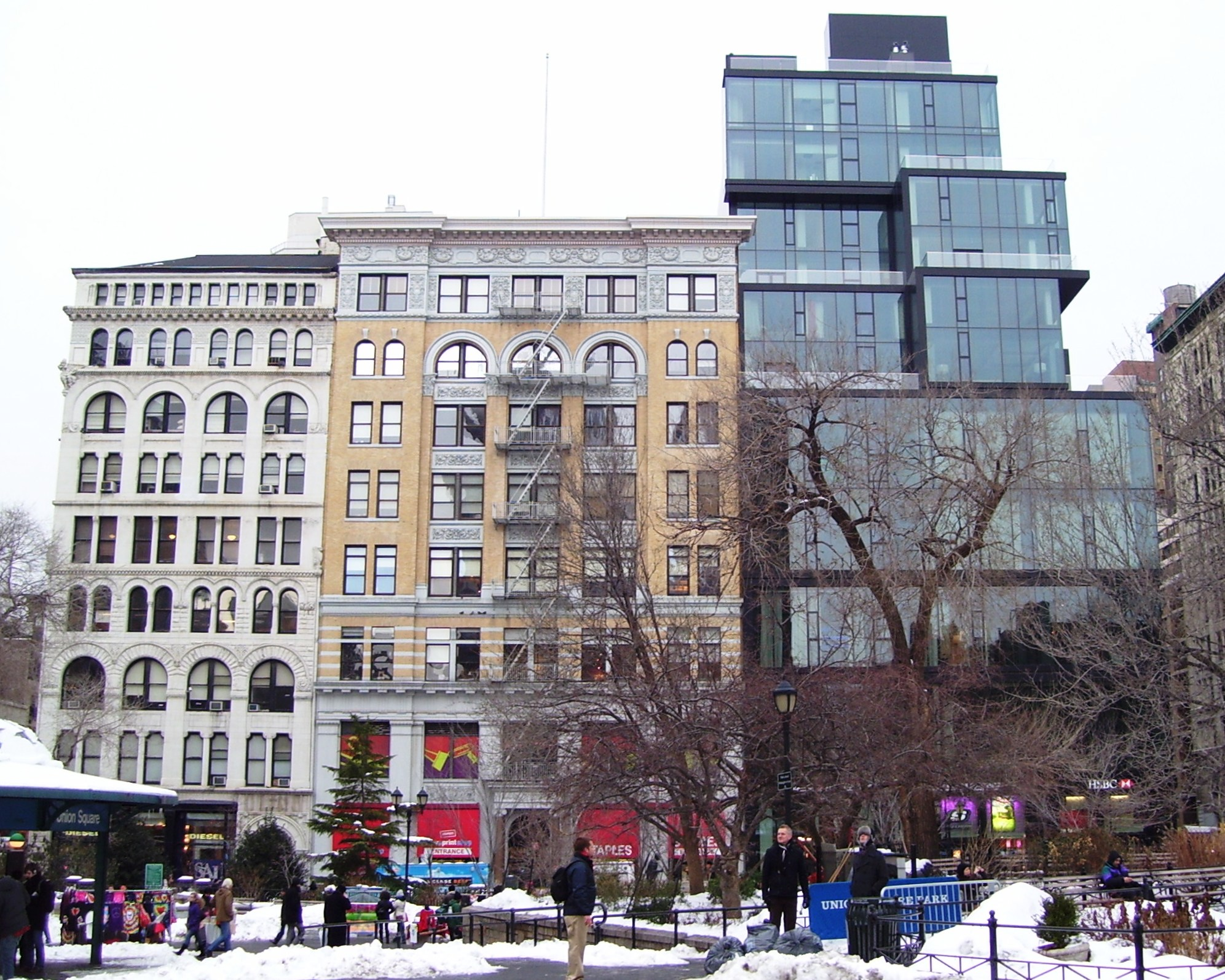
Viewed from Union Square. Left to right: Lincoln Building, Springler Building, 15 Union Square West.

The Spingler Building (also Springler Building or 5 Union Square West) is an eight-story Romanesque building at 5–9 Union Square West, between 14th and 15th Streets, in the Union Square neighborhood of Manhattan, New York City. Built in 1897 by William H. Hume & Son, it replaced a five-story building of the same name, which burned down in 1892. The Spingler Building occupies an L-shaped lot wrapping around 15 Union Square West to the north, and is also adjacent to the Lincoln Building to the south.

== History ==
=== Site and previous structures ===
The site of the Spingler Building was originally part of a 45-acre land grant issued during the Dutch colonial period by Director Willem Kieft to Simon Congo, a free Black man. This tract was one of three ground-briefs that eventually formed the 86-acre Brevoort Farm; the Congo grant was the northernmost of the three, with the southern tracts granted to Bastiaen Elyssen and Egbert Wooterse.

Historical records indicate that Simon Congo conveyed his 45-acre parcel to Teunis de Key and Reynier Quackenbush prior to 1701. The property subsequently passed to an individual identified in early maps only as "Uncle", hypothesized by historian I. N. Phelps Stokes to be land speculator Garret Onckelbagg, before being purchased by Hendrick Brevoort (1670-1718), who was known as "Henry Brevoort of the Bowery."

On January 29, 1762, the land was divided when Elias Brevoort sold the southern half (approximately 22 acres) to John Smith, a wealthy leather dresser, while the northern half became the Burling Farm. Smith held the property until his death, after which his executors, including Mayor James Duane, sold the land on February 29, 1788, to Christian Henrich Spengler (later known as Henry Spingler), a German shopkeeper. Spingler purchased the farm for £950 (approximately $4,750), and the land subsequently became known as the Spingler Farm.

Union Square was first laid out in the Commissioners' Plan of 1811, expanded in 1832, and then made into a public park in 1839. The completion of the park led to the construction of mansions surrounding it, which were largely replaced with commercial enterprises following the American Civil War. Despite this, the Spingler and Van Buren families continued to own the land under the western side of Union Square until 1958, leasing it out to various people. The Spingler Institute for Young Ladies, founded in 1843, was located at 5 Union Square West from 1848 until c. 1861, at which point it was turned into the Spingler Hotel. The hotel operated from 1864 until about 1878.

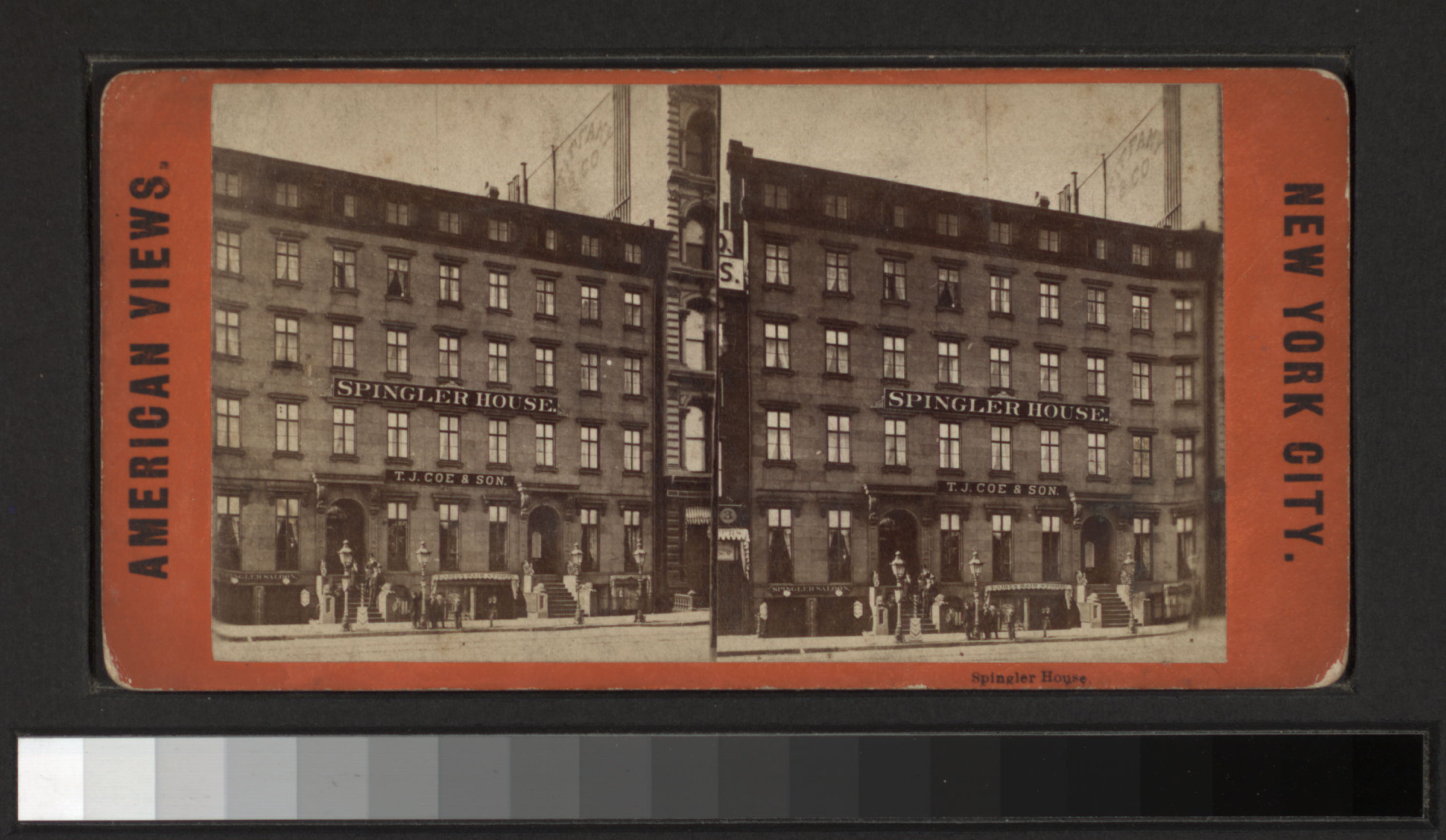
Stereoscopic view of Spingler House

By the late 1870s, technological advances in elevator technology and steel framework enabled the construction of taller office buildings. The original Spingler Building, a five-story loft and commercial structure on the site of the hotel, was completed in 1878 at a cost of $115,000. The Spingler Building was a L-shaped structure wrapping around the Tiffany & Co. building at 15 Union Square West to the northeast, with a depth of 200 feet (61 m) on Union Square West, along its eastern facade, and 70 feet (21 m) on 15th Street to the north. The structure housed the Brentano's book store. At the time, The New York Times said: "the block is now occupied by uniform buildings [...] the front is of iron, imposing in appearance, and the shops and lofts are of the first class." In 1892, the structure burned down in a fire that destroyed everything below the second floor, but only caused minor damage to its neighbors: the Lincoln Building (to the south) and 15 Union Square West. The charred walls of the old building remained standing for several years.

=== Modern building ===
On July 17, 1895, James L. Libby & Son leased 5–9 Union Square West as well as the adjacent 20 East 15th Street. The L-shaped building site covered about 14,000 square feet (1,300 m^{2}) and was roughly the same as the old building footprint. On this site, Libby & Son planned to build an eight-story limestone, brick, and terracotta building. The structure was to be designed by William H. Hume & Son. Land clearing began four days afterward, at which point The New York Times reported that the structure would be completed by May 1896. However, the new Spingler Building was not completed until sometime before March 1897, when Libby & Son ran advertisements in the New-York Tribune stating that the building had the "finest stores and lightest lofts in the city".

The Spingler Building was designed for multiple uses, including "stores, showrooms, manufacturing enterprises and industrial lofts," and catered in particular to Union Square's growing garment trade. Among the Spingler Building's first tenants were hatters Cluett, Coon & Co. who were reported to have moved into the building in an August 1897 issue of American Hatter magazine. In 1901, some of the upper-level space was leased to Mark Aronson, whose company manufactured cloaks and suits. This was followed in 1906 by Henry Hart of the Metropolitan Life Insurance Company, though Hart seems to have moved out the following year. One of the ground-floor stores was occupied in 1910 by the Cleveland Faucet Company. Besides Aronson's firm, other garment companies seem to have occupied the Spingler Building in the early 20th century, including the London Button Company. In the 1970s nylon strings guitars were also sold there, I have one, they were guitars made in Finland and sold at 5 Union Square as imports, Alfred Roldan NYC

In the late 1990s, the supply store chain Staples announced that it would open a location on Union Square West between 14th and 15th Streets, within 20,000 square feet (1,900 m^{2}) of space across two floors. The store opened in February 1997 within the Spingler Building at 5–9 Union Square West, where it is still located. Just before the store's opening, a particular point of contention was the presence of several large signs, including a lighted sign with 4-foot-tall (1.2 m) letters; four 9-foot-tall (2.7 m) vertical signs on the facade; and a bright red background behind some of the store windows. The Union Square Business Improvement District had requested that Staples reduce the size of these signs in January 1997, saying that the signs might be visually distracting. The New York City Department of Buildings had approved and then revoked the signs' permits, but even after the permit was rescinded, Staples erected the signs anyway, The dispute resulted in Staples being issued a summons for the New York City Criminal Court, and by the end of the year, the signs had been dismantled.

== Description ==
The Spingler Building is designed in the Romanesque style with classical influences. Its facade was designed with base, shaft, and capital sections, similar to the components of a column. The facade of the two-story base is of limestone; the five-story shaft is made of brick with terracotta detailing; and the one-story capital is made of terracotta.
