= Lincoln Building (Union Square, Manhattan) =

Commercial building in New York City

- U.S. National Register of Historic Places
- New York State Register of Historic Places
- New York City Landmark
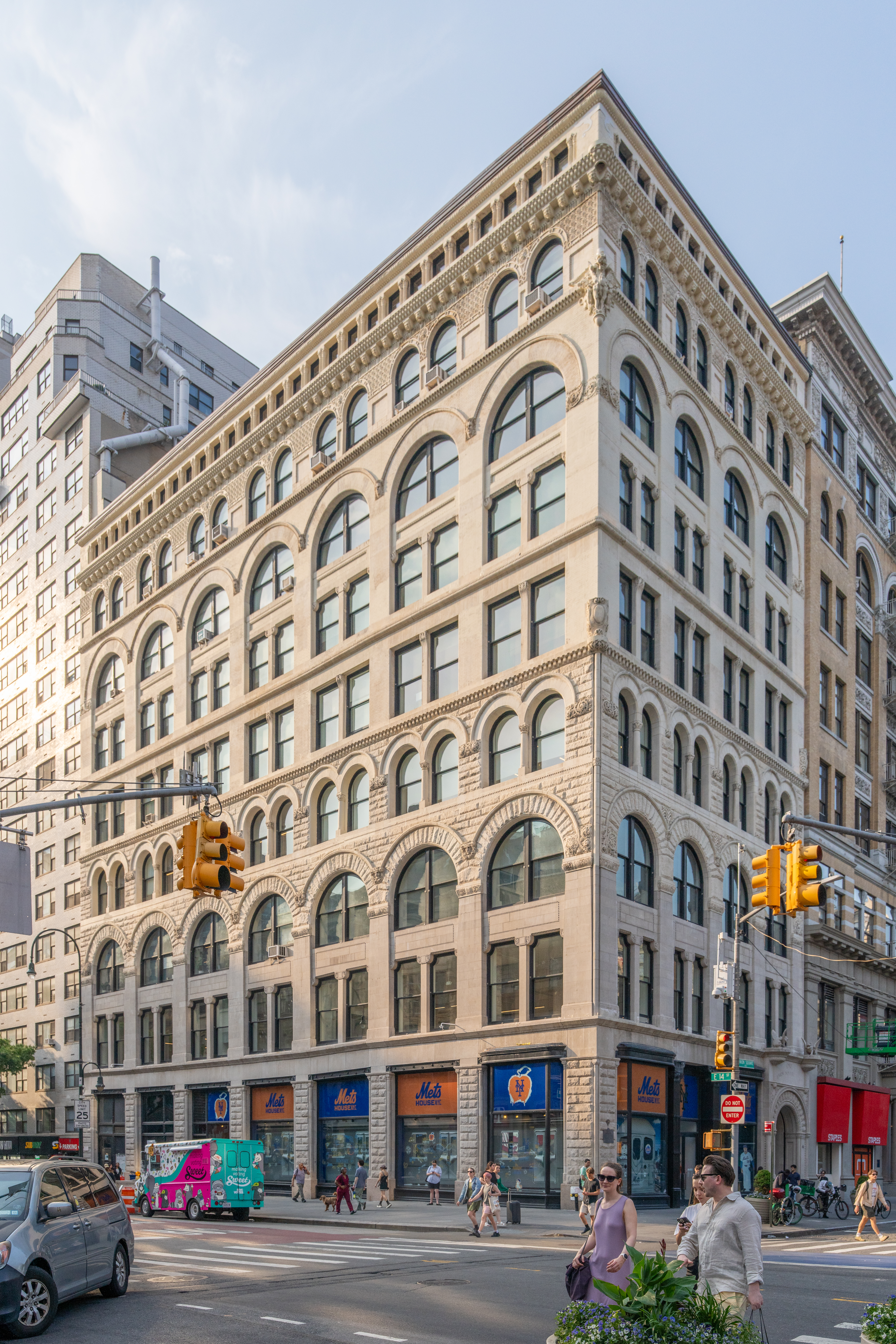
- (2025)

- Location within Lower Manhattan Location within New York City Location within New York Location within the United States
- Interactive map of Lincoln Building
- Location: 1 Union Sq. W. Manhattan, New York, US
- Coordinates: 40°44′8″N 73°59′32″W
- Built: 1887
- Architect: R. H. Robertson
- Architectural style: Romanesque, Romanesque Revival
- NRHP reference No.: 83001735
- NYSRHP No.: 06101.001799
- NYCL No.: 1536

Significant dates
- Added to NRHP: September 8, 1983
- Designated NYSRHP: August 10, 1983
- Designated NYCL: July 12, 1988

The Lincoln Building, also known as One Union Square West, is a Neo-Romanesque building at 1 Union Square West in the Union Square neighborhood of Manhattan in New York City. It is located at the northwest corner of Union Square West's intersection with 14th Street. Erected in 1889–1890 to a design by R. H. Robertson, it has a facade of masonry with terracotta detailing, and contains an interior structural system made of metal. The Lincoln Building was listed on the National Register of Historic Places in 1983, and is also a New York City Landmark.

== History ==
The site of the Lincoln Building was initially part of a farm owned by Henry Spingler (or Springler). Union Square was first laid out in the Commissioners' Plan of 1811, expanded in 1832, and then made into a public park in 1839. The completion of the park led to the construction of mansions surrounding it, which were largely replaced with commercial enterprises following the American Civil War. Despite this, the Spingler family continued to own the land under the western side of Union Square until 1958, leasing it out to various people. By the late 1870s, technological advances in elevator technology and steel framework enabled the construction of taller office buildings, such as the Lincoln Building, erected on land owned by the Spinglers.

The Lincoln Building was erected on the site of four other structures. According to the construction application submitted to the New York City Department of Buildings, the building was erected for one "Mr. Crawford", who was possibly tied to the Spingler family or the land's lessee. The site, at the northwest corner of Union Square West and 14th Street, was highly sought-out because it was considered to be part of Broadway "for all practical purposes". Ostensibly, the Lincoln Building was named for the statue of Abraham Lincoln in Union Square Park, directly across Union Square West.

The structure was designed by R. H. Robertson in 1887, being among his earliest works. Some sources cite the starting date as 1885, though this date is incorrect, as indicated by construction records. Initial plans called for a ten-story building, but the Lincoln Building was ultimately completed during 1889-1890 as a nine-story structure. Early tenants were involved in a variety of trades; they ranged from architects, such as Alfred Zucker, to building-trade companies and garment companies. Tenants also included the New York Motion Picture Company, which opened an office in the building in 1910, and the Universal Film Manufacturing Company (later Universal Pictures), which was founded at the building in 1912. In the 2010s, lessees included an online restaurant-reservations company and a denim producer.

== Architecture ==
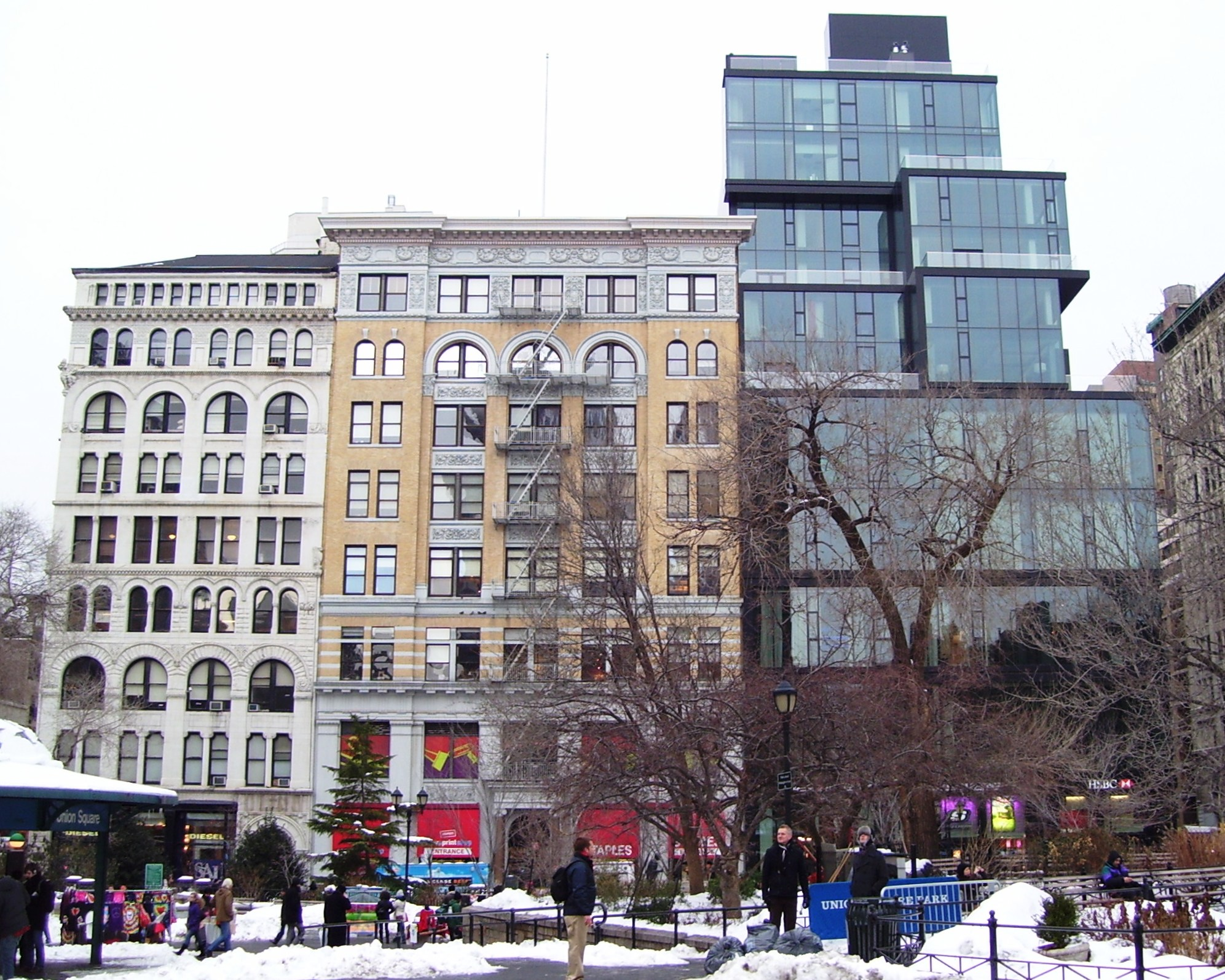
Viewed from Union Square. Left to right: Lincoln Building, Spingler Building, 15 Union Square West

The Lincoln Building, at nine stories tall, is considered an early "transitional skyscraper", preceding Robertson's later commissions, which were true skyscrapers. As such, it was recognized by the New York City Landmarks Preservation Commission as an official city landmark in 1988, and listed on the National Register of Historic Places in 1983. The Lincoln Building's features included load-bearing walls of masonry, as in older structures, but also incorporated an interior frame composed of structural steel and cast iron, which would be a common feature in later skyscrapers.

=== Form ===
The Lincoln Building was designed with a base, shaft, and capital, similar to the components of a column. This format of articulation was later used in true skyscrapers. It incorporates two-story arcades to draw vertical emphasis to the building, but also includes stacked floors for horizontal emphasis. The three-part articulation format was also used in the Judge Building (1888-1890) and in the old New York Times Building (1888-1889).

=== Facade ===
The Lincoln Building contains seven vertical architectural bays along the 14th Street facade to the south, and four bays on the Union Square West facade to the east. The ground floor contains storefronts and is the only part of the building that has been significantly modified from its original design. On the floors above, the architectural bays facing 14th Street appear to be wider than those facing Union Square, and the style of fenestration or window arrangement is different for each floor.

The second through fourth floors are office floors, faced with limestone, with a cornice running above the fourth floor. The second and third floors comprise an arcade with smooth piers made of limestone underneath rocky arches. Each of the bays contain two rectangular windows on the second floor and one wide arched window on the third floor. On the fourth floor, each bay has a pair of thinner arched windows, separated by a column. The northeast and southeast corners of the building contain three-story colonettes that span the second through fourth floors, which are topped by foliate capitals.

The fifth floor is faced with smooth limestone and brick. The facade contains a belt course on top of the fifth floor, which projects slightly. The sixth and seventh floors also comprise an arcade, similar to the second and third floors, but with a smooth brick face. A cornice runs atop the seventh story, and the southeast corner of the building also contains a molding at the cornice.

The eighth floor contains two round-arched windows in each bay. The upper half of this floor contains moldings with Celtic and Byzantine-style guilloché designs. The ninth story contains a loggia with rectangular windows each separated by two terracotta spiral columns, while the attic contains a ovolo molding.

== Critical reception ==
Architectural criticism of the Lincoln Building was mixed. Montgomery Schuyler, writing for Architectural Record, said that he appreciated "the picturesque features in which [Robertson's] other work abounds", but noted in particular that the Lincoln Building's many horizontal layers "confuse the principal division". However, Engineering Magazine wrote that there was a "lack of unity" in the materials used for the facade. Conversely, Schuyler appreciated the manner in which Robertson juxtaposed the different materials in the facade, and the use of Romanesque detailing.

== See also ==
- List of New York City Designated Landmarks in Manhattan from 14th to 59th Streets
- National Register of Historic Places listings in Manhattan from 14th to 59th Streets
