= List of public art in Manhattan =

List of public artworks in Manhattan, New York, U.S.

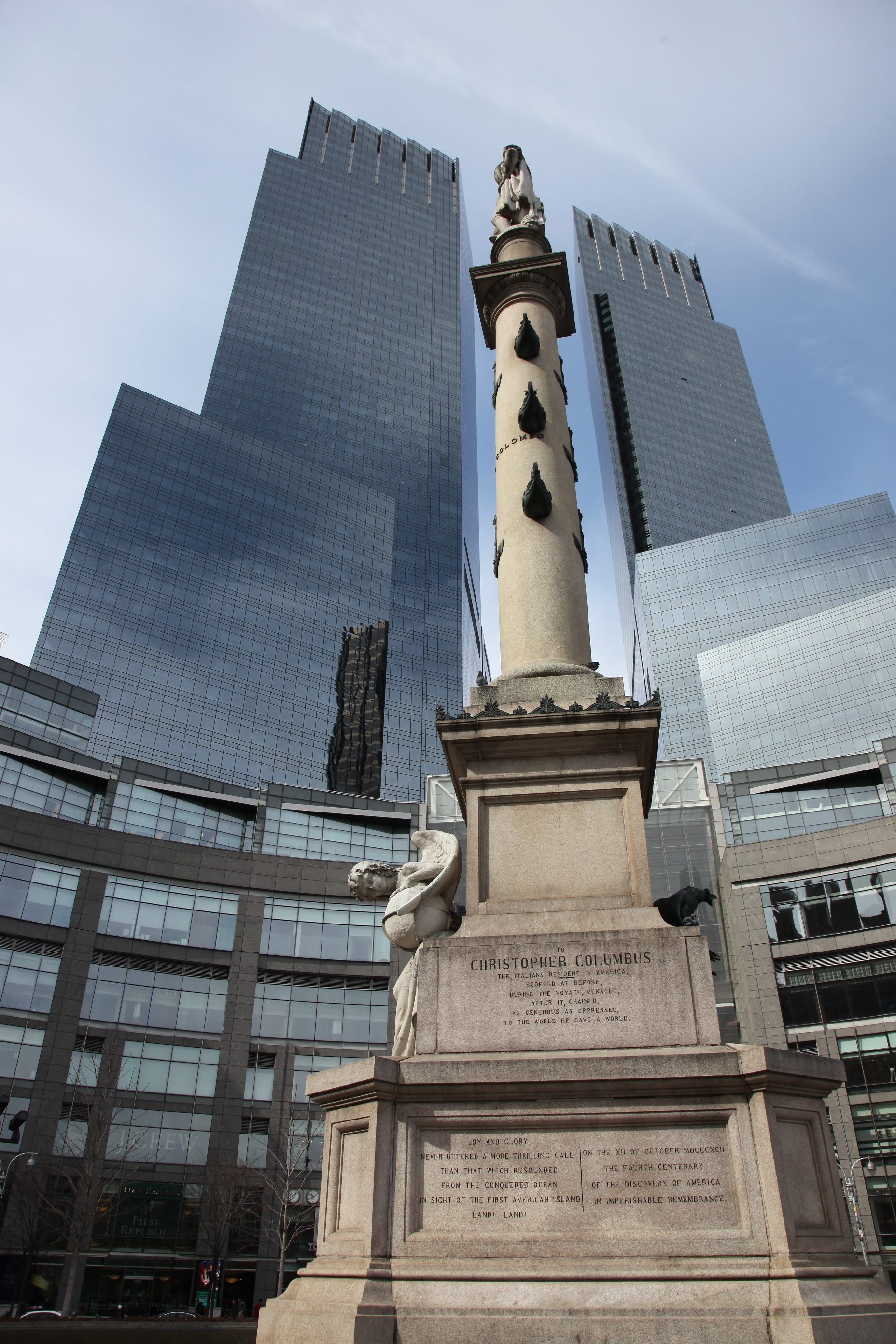
Columbus Monument

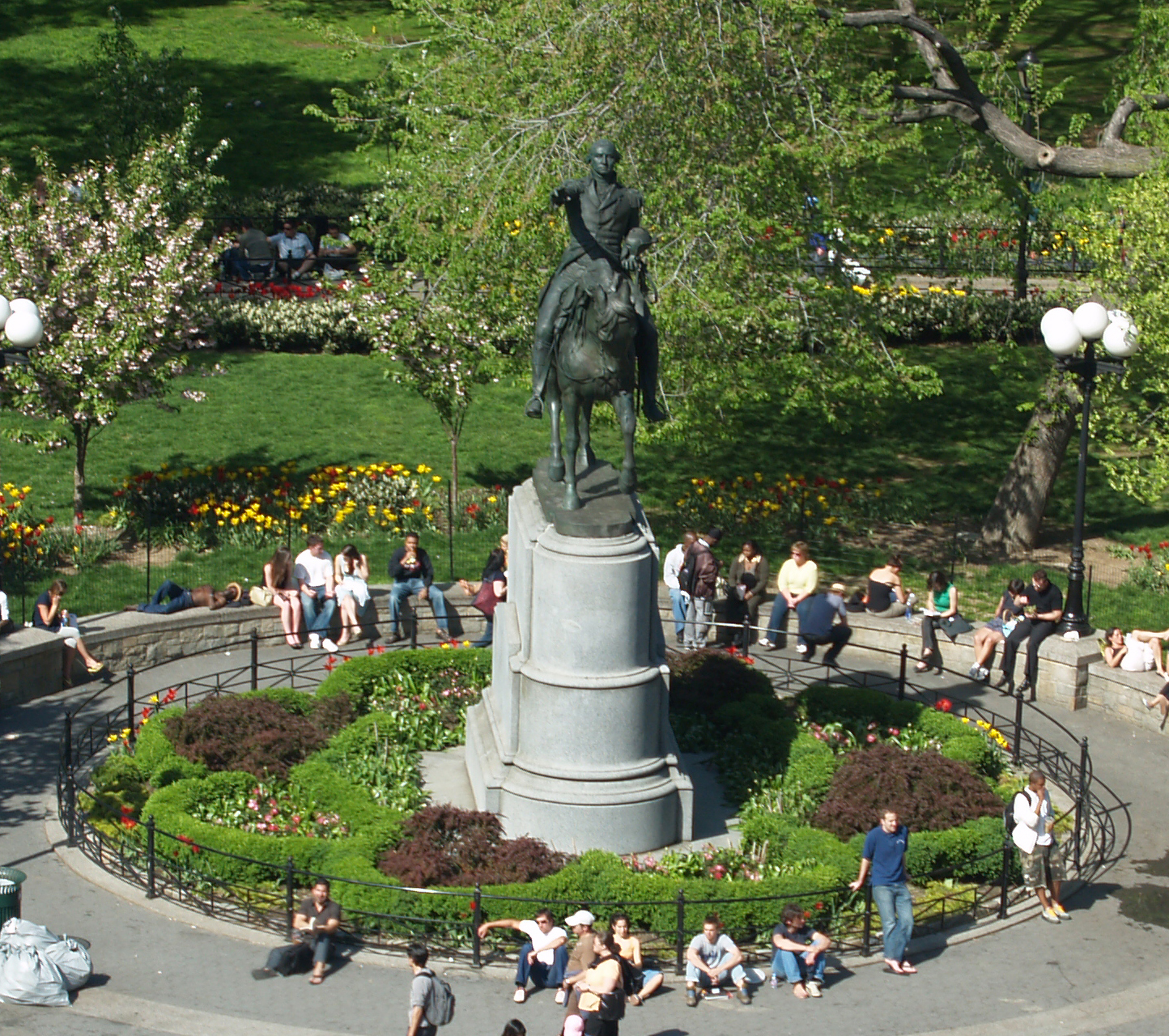
Equestrian statue of George Washington

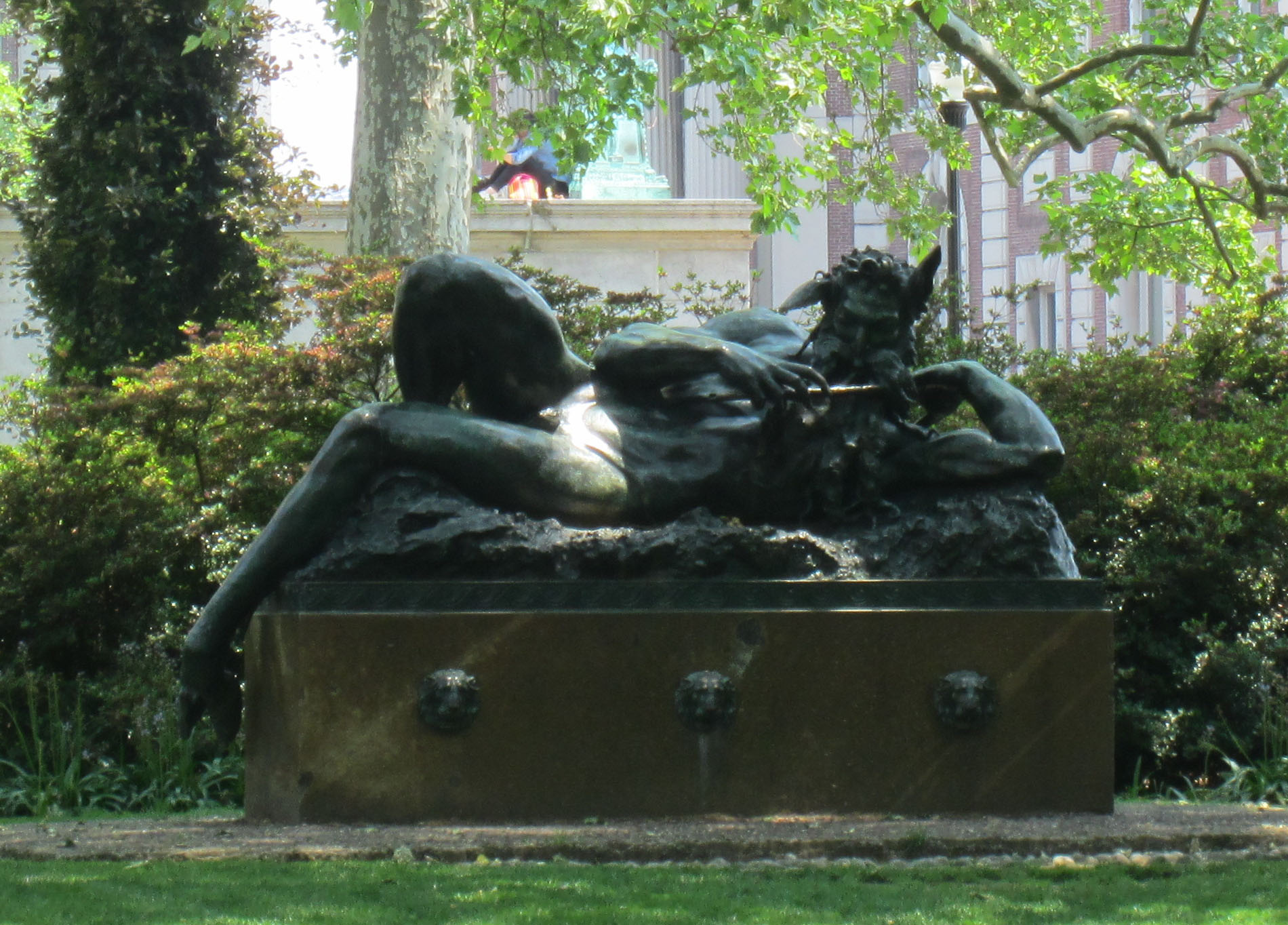
The Great God Pan

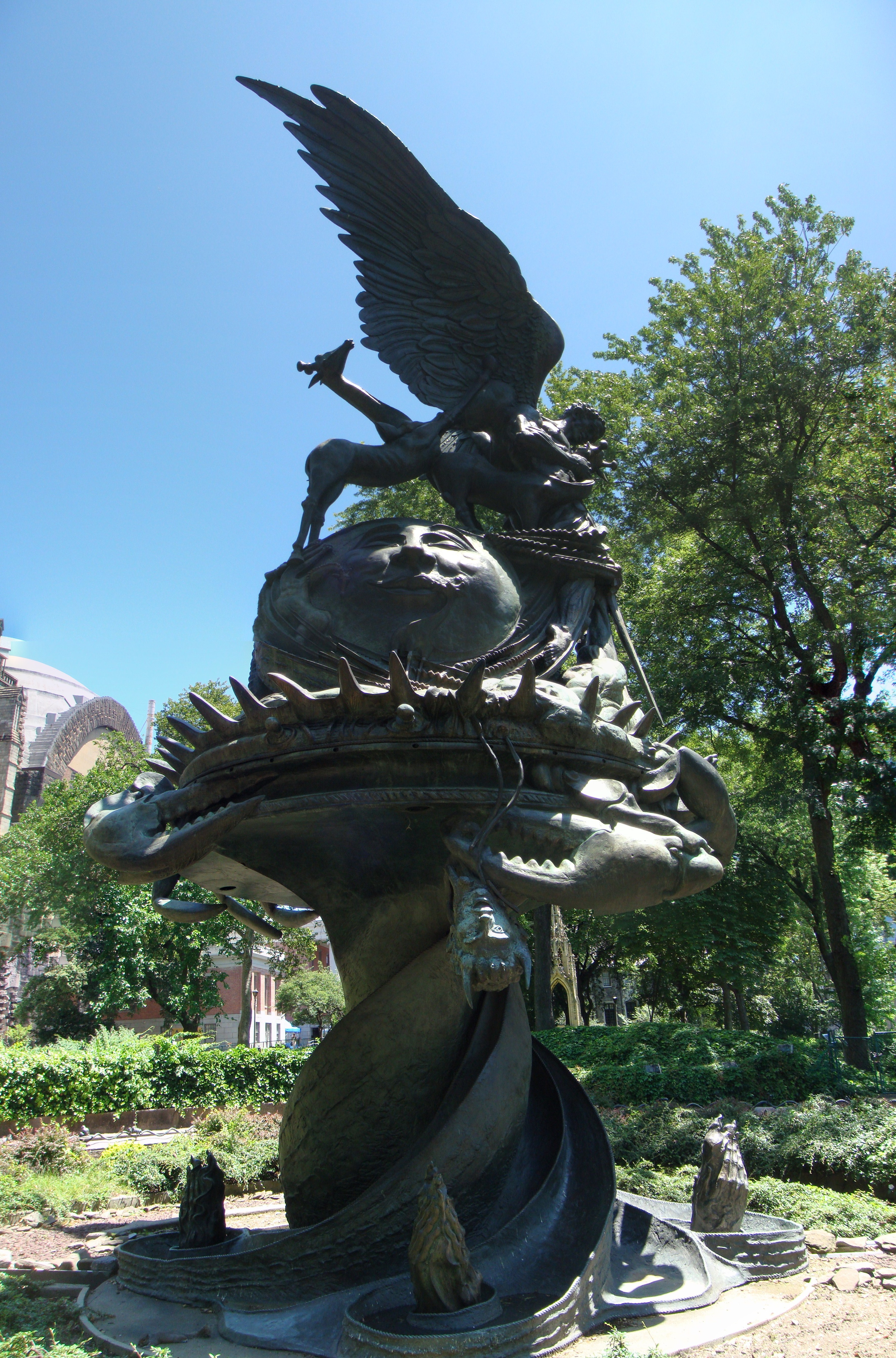
Peace Fountain

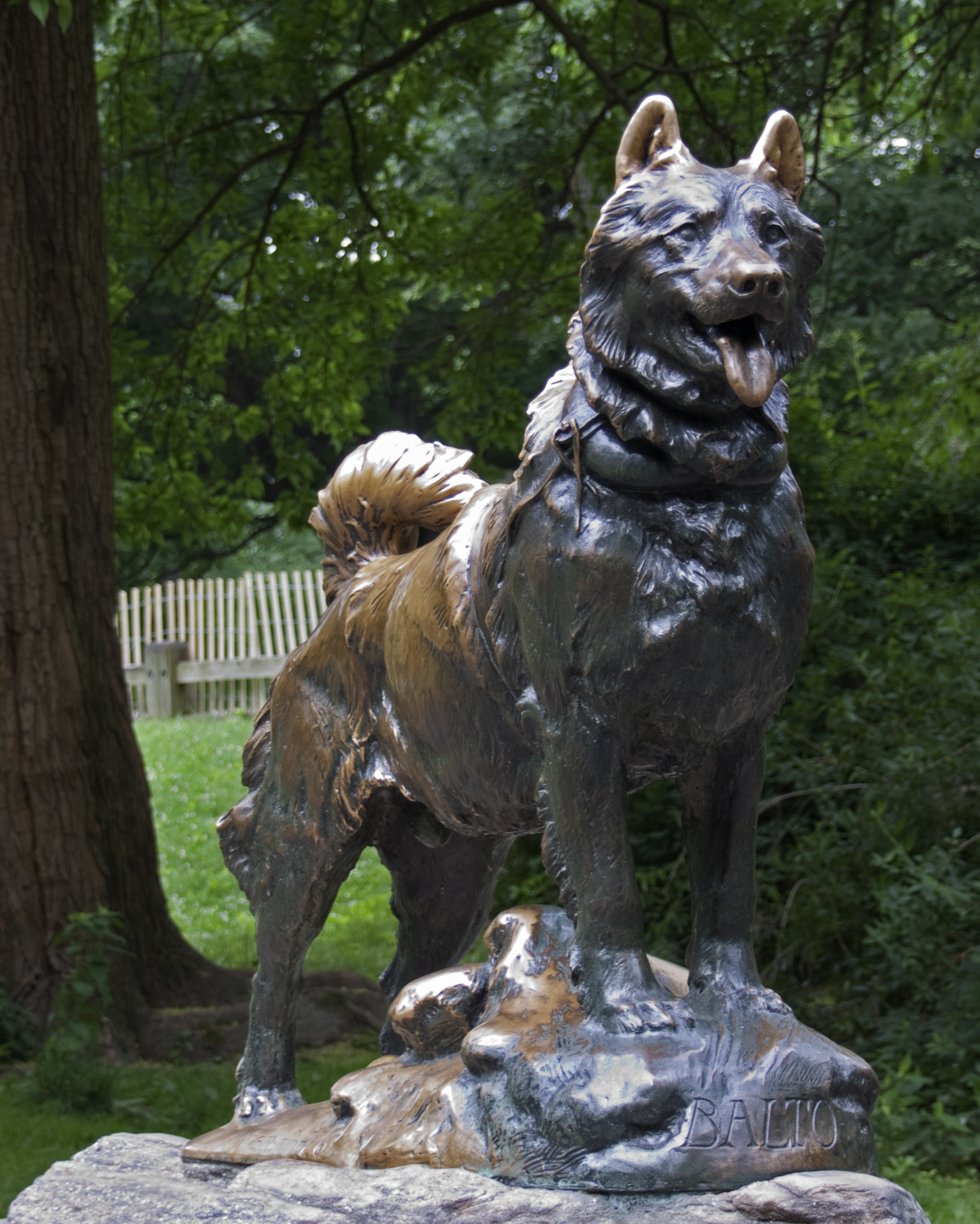
Statue of Balto

The following public artworks have been displayed in Manhattan in New York City:

- 1993 World Trade Center Bombing Memorial
- 5 in 1
- 107th Infantry Memorial
- Admiral David Glasgow Farragut
- Alamo
- Alma Mater
- Atlas
- Ballplayers House Frieze
- Bellerophon Taming Pegasus
- Bent Propeller
- Bethesda Fountain
- Burnett Memorial Fountain
- Bust of Alexander Lyman Holley
- Bust of Giuseppe Mazzini
- Bust of Golda Meir
- Bust of Victor Herbert
- Charging Bull
- Cloud Fortress
- Columbus Circle globe
- Columbus Monument
- El Cid Campeador
- Delacorte Clock
- Double Check
- Eagles and Prey
- Eleanor Roosevelt Monument
- The Emperor Has No Balls
- Equestrian statue of George Washington
- Equestrian statue of Joan of Arc
- Equestrian statue of José de San Martín
- Equestrian statue of José Martí
- Equestrian statue of Simón Bolívar
- Equestrian Statue of Theodore Roosevelt
- Eternal Light Flagstaff
- Event Horizon
- Eye of Fashion
- The Family
- Fearless Girl
- Four Continents
- Frederick Douglass Memorial
- The Gates
- Gay Liberation Monument
- General William Jenkins Worth Monument
- The Girl Puzzle Monument
- Bust of Johann Wolfgang von Goethe
- The Great God Pan
- Group of Bears
- Group of Four Trees (Jean Dubuffet)
- Harriet Tubman Memorial
- Ideogram
- Independence Flagstaff
- Indian Hunter
- John Howard Van Amringe
- Joie de Vivre
- Josephine Shaw Lowell Memorial Fountain
- King Jagiello Monument
- Letters and Science
- Louise Nevelson Plaza
- A Love Letter to Marsha
- Life Force
- Madison Square Park Fountain
- Marquis de Lafayette
- Memorial to Victims of the Injustice of the Holocaust
- Metronome
- Mural (Julie Mehretu)
- Needle Threading A Button
- ONE: Union of the Senses
- Peace Fountain
- Prometheus
- Pulitzer Fountain
- Reclining Figure (Lincoln Center)
- Richard Morris Hunt Memorial
- La Rivière
- Robert Burns
- Romeo and Juliet
- Samuel Finley Breese Morse
- Saurien
- Seventh Regiment Memorial
- Sky Gate, New York
- The Sphere
- Spirit of Communication
- Statue of Abraham Lincoln
- Statue of Adam Clayton Powell Jr.
- Statue of Alexander Hamilton, Central Park
- Statue of Alexander Hamilton, Columbia University
- Statue of Balto
- Statue of Benito Juárez
- Statue of Chester A. Arthur
- Statue of Christopher Columbus
- Statue of Daniel Webster
- Statue of Fiorello H. La Guardia
- Statue of Fitz-Greene Halleck
- Statue of Francis P. Duffy
- Statue of George M. Cohan
- Statue of George Washington, Wall Street
- Statue of Gertrude Stein
- Statue of Giuseppe Garibaldi
- Statue of Horace Greeley (City Hall Park)
- Statue of Horace Greeley (Herald Square)
- Statue of Jan Karski
- Statue of John Watts
- Statue of José Bonifácio de Andrada
- Statue of Mahatma Gandhi
- Statue of Philip Sheridan
- Statue of Roscoe Conkling
- Statue of Sun Yat-sen
- Statue of Thomas Jefferson
- Statue of Walter Scott
- Statue of William E. Dodge
- Statue of William H. Seward
- Statue of William Shakespeare
- Tau (1/3)
- Tau
- The Tempest
- Three Dancing Maidens
- Three-Way Piece: Points
- Throwback (1/3)
- Tightrope Walker
- Tilted Arc
- Triumph of the Human Spirit
- Union Square Drinking Fountain
- Untermyer Fountain
- USS Maine National Monument
- Giuseppe Verdi Monument
- Vessel
- The Wall
- William Cullen Bryant Memorial
- William Tecumseh Sherman
- Women's Rights Pioneers Monument
- The World Trade Center Tapestry

== See also ==
- Grand Central Terminal art
- List of sculptures in Central Park
- West Harlem Art Fund
