= Public art in Central Park =

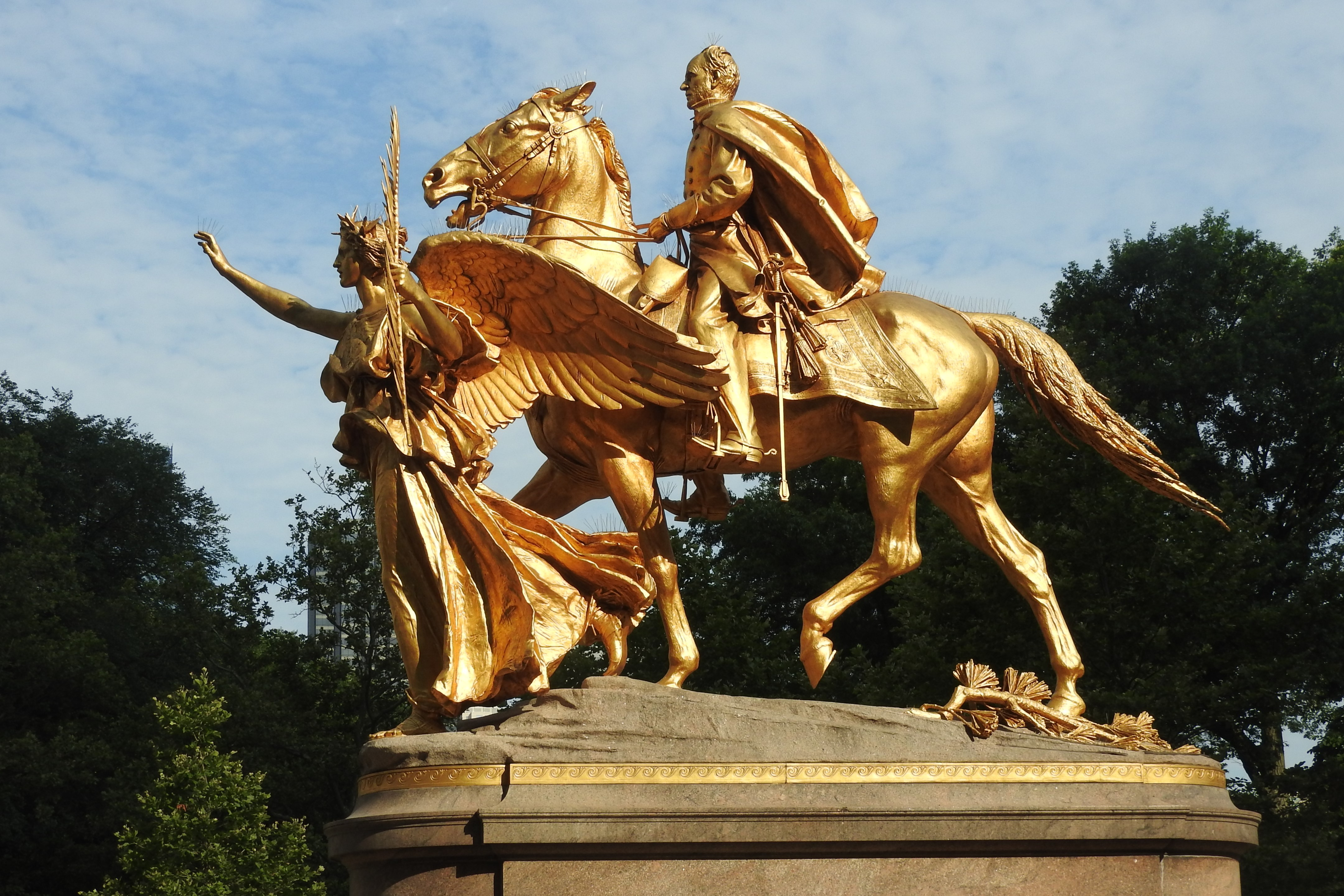
The gilded bronze statue of the Sherman Monument (dedicated in 1903), sculpted by Augustus Saint-Gaudens on a pedestal designed by Charles Follen McKim.

New York City's 843-acre (3.41 km^{2}) Central Park is the home of many works of public art in various media, such as bronze, stone, and tile. Many are sculptures in the form of busts, statues, equestrian statues, and panels carved or cast in low relief. Others are two-dimensional bronze or tile plaques. Some artworks do double-duty as fountains, or as part of fountains; some serve as memorials dedicated to a cause, to notable individuals, and in one case, to a notable animal. Most were donated by individuals or civic organizations; only a few were funded by the city.

Examples of public art in the park include memorials dedicated to notable individuals such as the poet William Shakespeare and the statesman Daniel Webster; depictions of archetypical characters such as The Pilgrim, Indian Hunter, and The Falconer; depictions of literary characters such as Alice in Wonderland; numerous depictions of imaginary animals, and at least one of a real one (the statue of Balto). The only artifact from the ancient world is the Egyptian obelisk known as "Cleopatra's Needle", the oldest and tallest artwork in the park.

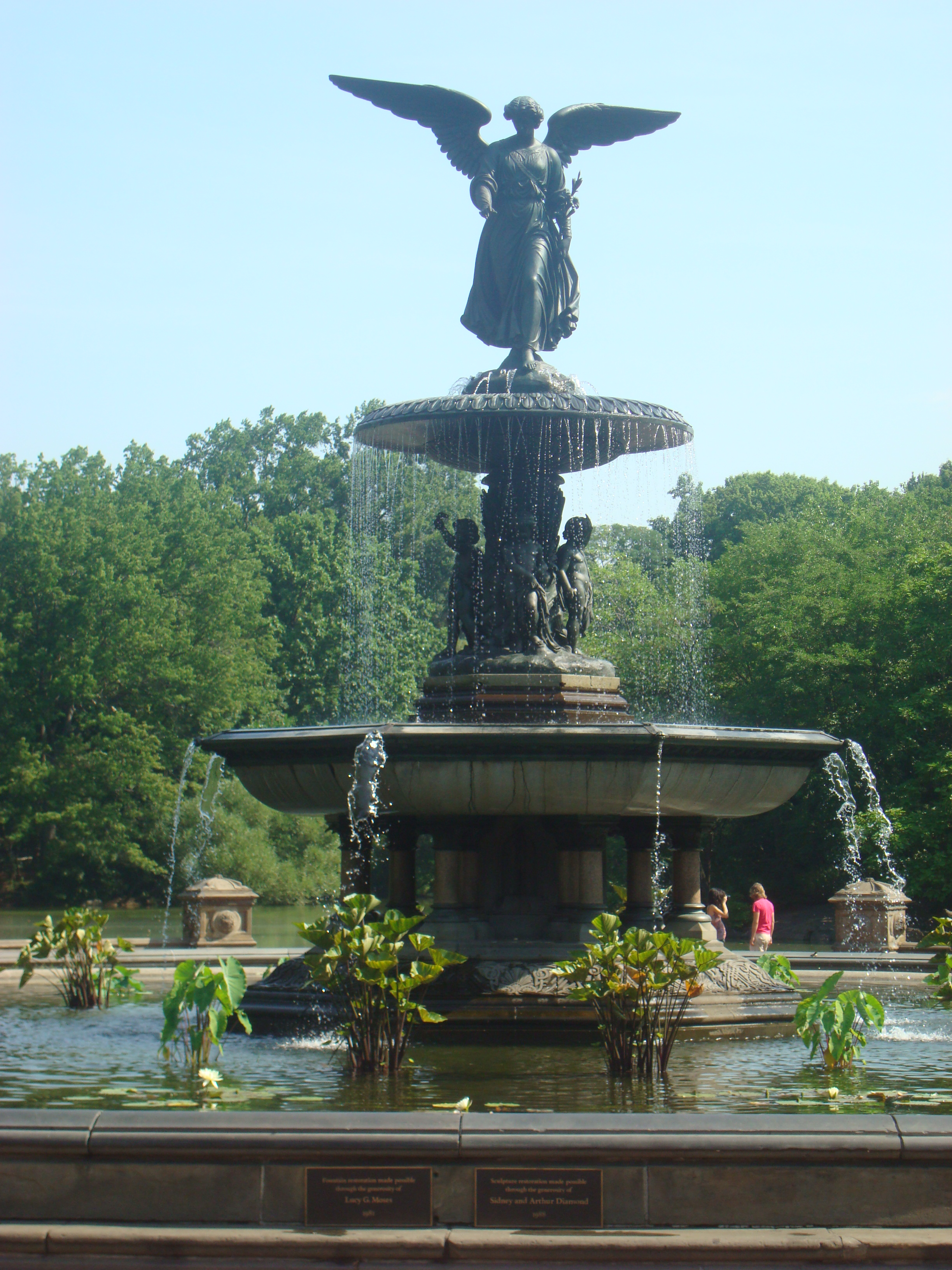
The bronze statue Angel of the Waters at Bethesda Terrace, by Emma Stebbins, atop a stone basin by Jacob Wrey Mould and Central Park's co-designer Calvert Vaux.

Traditionally, depictions of real (as opposed to imaginary) humans were men, whereas depictions of women have been either mythological characters (angels or goddesses) or characters from literature. The installation in 2020 of the Women's Rights Pioneers Monument, depicting three female activists, was a first step in addressing this oversight.

In recent years, park administrators have provided a forum for temporary exhibitions of artwork at the Doris Freedman Plaza, just outside the park's southeast entrance.

== List of public art in Central Park ==
Name	Location / GPS Coordinates	Date & Designers	Notes
107th Infantry Memorial (World War One)	Fifth Ave., opp. 67th St. 40.76927°N 73.96937°W	Commissioned in 1920; dedicated in 1927; Karl Illava, sculptor; Rogers & Haneman, architects; Fonderia G. Vignali, founder.	A bronze sculpture atop a North Jay granite base, in honor of the 7th Regiment New York, 107th United States Infantry. IAS Number: 76003536
Alice in Wonderland	North side of Central Park's Conservatory Pond. 40.77504°N 73.966543°W	Unveiled in 1959; Ferando Texidor, designer; José de Creeft, sculptor; Hideo Sasaki, landscape architect; cast by the Modern Art Foundry.	A bronze sculpture atop a base of Chelmsford granite depicting characters from Lewis Carroll's 1865 classic Alice's Adventures in Wonderland: Alice, seated on a giant mushroom, the White Rabbit, the Cheshire Cat, the Dormouse, and Mad Hatter. Donated by publisher George Delacorte in memory of his wife Margarita, the sculpture is embellished with quotations from her favorite poem, "Jabberwocky". IAS Number: 87870163
Statue of Hans Christian Andersen	West side of Central Park's Conservatory Pond. 40.7744306°N 73.9677972°W	Unveiled in 1956; Georg J. Lober, sculptor; cast by the Modern Art Foundry; Otto Frederick Langman, designer of bench.	A bronze statue depicting the Danish fairytale author Hans Christian Andersen, seated on a Stony Creek granite bench, feeding a duck (his most notable work being The Ugly Duckling). Funded with contributions from Danish and American schoolchildren. IAS Number: |87870162
Ballplayers House Frieze	North side of Heckscher Ballfields. 40.7703°N 73.975917°W	Completed in 1990; Buttrick White & Burtis, architects.	An encaustic tile frieze wrapping the building, symbolizing a ball bouncing across a baseball field.
Statue of Balto	Between the East 67th St. park entrance and Central Park East Drive. 40.769959°N 73.971022°W	Unveiled in 1925; Frederick G.R. Roth, sculptor; Roman Bronze Works.	A bronze statue mounted on natural rock, portraying one of over 200 sled-dogs that delivered diphtheria serum through a blizzard to Nome, Alaska in January 1925. Balto attended the dedication of his statue (a rarity among Central Park statuary subjects) and died in 1933. IAS Number: 87870159
Bust of Ludwig van Beethoven	West side of The Mall. 40.772866°N 73.971872°W	Installed in 1884; Henry Baerer, sculptor; George Fischer & Brother Bronze Works.	A bronze bust atop a polished Barre granite plinth created in memory of the German composer. IAS Number: 76003467
Belvedere Castle Cockatrice	Belvedere Castle. 40.779447°N 73.96906°W	Completed in 1869; Jacob Wrey Mould, designer of the cockatrice; Calvert Vaux, architect of the castle.	A decorative bronze transom panel in the facade of the Belvedere Castle.
Bethesda Fountain	Bethesda Terrace. 40.774111°N 73.971139°W	Unveiled in 1873; Emma Stebbins, sculptor of the angel & four cherubs; Royal Foundry (Munich, Germany); Jacob Wrey Mould, designer of architectural ornament; Calvert Vaux, architect.	A bronze statue known as the Angel of the Waters atop a reeded bronze basin, supported by four cherubs atop a polychrome stone basin, which in turn sits in a 90 foot diameter basin. Emma Stebbins is said to have been the first woman to receive a public sculptural commission in New York City. IAS Number: 76002831
Bethesda Terrace Balustrade	Bethesda Terrace and Terrace Drive. 40.773949°N 73.9711001°W	Jacob Wrey Mould, architectural sculpture and ornament; Calvert Vaux, architect.	A variety of architectural sculpture and ornament carved in New Brunswick sandstone at the terrace balustrades and piers.
Bethesda Terrace Arcade	Beneath Terrace Drive. 40.773949°N 73.9711001°W	Installed in 1869; Jacob Wrey Mould, designer of ornamental tiles; Calvert Vaux, architect of arcade; Mintons, tile fabricator.	Forty-nine encaustic tile panels framed in cast iron, suspended from the roadway above. Each panel is made from 324 individual tiles.
Equestrian statue of Simón Bolívar	Bolívar Plaza, Central Park South, opp. Ave. of the Americas. 40.765689°N 73.975792°W	Dedicated in 1921; Sally James Farnham, sculptor; Roman Bronze Works; relocated in 1951.	A bronze equestrian statue atop a polished black granite plinth, originally sited between 82nd and 83rd Streets overlooking Central Park West. In 1951, after Sixth Avenue was renamed Avenue of the Americas, the sculpture was relocated adjacent fellow Latin American revolutionary leaders José de San Martín and José Martí. IAS Number: 76003468
Arthur Brisbane Memorial	Fifth Ave. opp. 101st St. 40.791183°N 73.953557°W	Installed in 1939; Richmond Barthé, sculptor; Shreve, Lamb and Harmon, architects.	A bench with a relief portrait of journalist Arthur Brisbane (1864-1936), sculpted in Swenson's pink granite. IAS Number: 76003469
Conservatory Garden; Burnett Memorial Fountain	Fifth Ave. opp. 105th St. 40.793056°N 73.952778°W	Dedicated in 1937; Bessie Potter Vonnoh, sculptor; Aymar Embury II, architect; Roman Bronze Works.	A bronze sculpture atop a pink granite plinth sitting in a small basin, created in memory of children's author Frances Hodgson Burnett. The work illustrates Mary and Dickon, characters from her book The Secret Garden (1910). IAS Number: 76003471
Statue of Robert Burns	Literary Walk, south end of The Mall. 40.770108°N 73.972570°W	Dedicated in 1880; Sir John Steell, sculptor.	A bronze statue of Burns atop a pink granite base, created in memory of the Scots poet. IAS Number: 76003469
Cherry Hill Fountain	Cherry Hill, south of The Lake. 40.774698°N 73.972712°W	Jacob Wrey Mould, architectural ornament; Calvert Vaux, architect.	
City Employees War Memorial	West side of The Mall. 40.773056°N 73.971944°W	Installed in 1928; Georg J. Lober, sculptor; Otto Frederick Langman, architect.	An iron flagstaff supported by a bronze mounting embellished with four medallions and four eagles, sitting atop a Deer Isle granite pedestal with inscriptions. The memorial is dedicated to city employees who are, or were, veterans of American wars. Lober and Langman collaborated on the statue of George M. Cohan, installed at Duffy Square in 1959. IAS Number: 76003476
Cleopatra's Needle	West of the Metropolitan Museum. 40.779638°N 73.965451°W	Erected by Thutmose III at the Temple of Tum at Heliopolis ca 1500–1600 B.C.; gifted to US in 1869; dedicated in Central Park in 1881.	An ancient Egyptian obelisk, a gift of Egypt to the United States. ISA Number: 87870165
Statue of Christopher Columbus	East Drive, south of The Mall; 40.769899°N 73.972791°W	Jeronimo Suñol, sculptor; Napoleon LeBrun, architect; Federico Masriera, foundry in Barcelona.	A bronze statue atop a Rockport granite plinth. Cast in Barcelona in 1892, the statue was donated to Central Park by the New York Genealogical and Biographical Society in commemoration of the 400th anniversary of Columbus's arrival in the Americas. The statue replicates one made by Jeronimo Suñol in 1886, now in Madrid. The New York version was placed in the park in 1894 at the foot of the Mall. ISA Number: 87870160
Conservatory Garden Central Fountain	Fifth Ave. opp. 105th St. 40.793892°N 73.952824°W	Installed in 1937 when the garden was created.	A single column of water that collects in a circular basin. A display fountain.
Dana Discovery Center Donor's Plaque	North shore of Harlem Meer. 40.7970821°N 73.95147°W	Dedicated in 1993; Buttrick White & Burtis, architects.	
Dana Discovery Center Plaque	North shore of Harlem Meer. 40.7970821°N 73.95147°W	Dedicated in 1993; Buttrick White & Burtis, architects.	An encaustic tile panel depicting fish and fowl, the name of the building and the date of its construction. A chevron band symbolizes the water of Harlem Meer which the building overlooks.
Dancing Goat	Central Park Zoo, north of the Sea Lion Pool. 40.768185°N 73.971568°W	Installed in 1935; Frederick Roth, sculptor; cast by the Roman Bronze Works; relocated in 1988.	A bronze statue on a granite platform, functioning as a fountain, set into an arched niche. IAS Number: 76003481
Decorative Zoological Panels	Central Park Zoo.	Installed ca 1934; Frederick Roth, sculptor.	Fifteen limestone panels of animals carved in low relief. IAS Number: 76003538
Delacorte Clock	Children's Zoo. 40.768056°N 73.971111°W	Installed in 1964; Andrea Spadini, sculptor; Edward Coe Embury, architect; Fernando Texidor, designer.	The monkeys atop the tower ring the bell on the hour. The lower 6 animals twirl and parade around the tower on the hour and half-hour.: Two monkeys (ringing the bell); Penguin (with drum); Hippopotamus (with violin); Bear (with tambourine); Elephant (with concertina); Goat (with Pan pipes); Kangaroo (with horn); Baby Kangaroo (with small clarinet); IAS Number: 87870158
Frederick Douglass Memorial	Frederick Douglass Circle, Central Park North & Frederick Douglass Boulevard. 40.800583°N 73.958167°W	Dedicated in 2011; Gabriel Koren, sculptor; Algernon Miller and Quennell Rothschild & Partners, plaza and fountain design; Polich-Tallix, foundry.	A larger-than-life bronze statue on a bronze base on a granite platform, set in the middle of a memorial plaza dedicated to Douglass, a 19th-century abolitionist, activist, and author.
Daniel Draper Plaque	Belvedere Castle. 40.779447°N 73.96906°W	Installed in 1035; Anton Brandts Subiesky, sculptor.	IAS Number:76003487
S. Rankin Drew Memorial Tree Marker	72nd St., west of The Mall. 40.773632°N 73.972120°W	Installed in 1928; unknown designer.	Drew was a silent movie actor/director who died in World War I. The American Legion planted an oak tree in his memory in 1920, and installed the marker in 1928. IAS Number: 76003488
Granite Eagles	Central Park Zoo.	Installed on the First Avenue Bridge in 1912; Rochette and Parzini, sculptors. Relocated to Central Park in 1941.	Eight statues salvaged from an overpass built in 1912 to span the Shore Parkway in Brooklyn, NY, but demolished in 1941. IAS Number: 76003491
Eagles and Prey	Center Drive, opp. Lilac Walk. 40.772474°N 73.972484°W	Cast in Paris in 1850; installed in Central Park in 1863; Christophe Fratin, sculptor; Gordon Webster Burnham, donor.	A bronze sculpture on a Quincy granite pedestal depicting a goat captured by two eagles. Said to be the earliest sculpture installed in a New York City park. IAS Number: 76003492
Duke Ellington Memorial	Duke Ellington Circle, Fifth Ave. & 110th St. 40.79675°N 73.949028°W	Dedicated in 1997; Robert Graham, sculptor.	A bronze statue of the musician and composer astride a piano on a platform supported by nine bronze caryatids standing on a red granite platform.
The Falconer	West 72nd St. 40.774111°N 73.973806°W	Cast in 1871; installed in 1875; George Blackall Simonds, sculptor; Clemente Papi, foundry.	A bronze statue on a Barre granite pedestal. IAS Number: 76003496
Fort Clinton Memorial	McGowan's Pass, Between Fifth Ave. & East Drive, opp. 107th St. 40.7951434°N 73.9529624°W	Installed in 1906; William Welles Bosworth, designer.	A pedestal for a mortar unearthed at the long ago demolished Fort Clinton. IAS Number: 76002752
Friedel Memorial Drinking Fountain	Runners Gate, Fifth Ave. opp. 90th St.	Dedicated in 1992; Mark Rabinowitz, sculptor.	
Andrew Haswell Green Memorial Bench	East Drive, east of The Ravine; 40.795126°N 73.954291°W	Dedicated in 1929; John Vredenburgh Van Pelt, architect.	A Tennessee pink marble bench dedicated to a key member of the park's Board of Commissioners during the park's construction.
Group of Bears	Pat Hoffman Friedman Playground, 79th St. & Fifth Ave. 40.7775°N 73.963967°W	Paul Manship, sculptor; Bruce Kelly and David Varnell, landscape architects for 1989 installation; cast by Paul King Foundry.	A bronze sculpture depicting three bears, on a bronze base atop a granite step-stone, first cast in 1932 for the Bronx Zoo. This version was cast in 1989. IAS Number: NY000142
Statue of Fitz-Greene Halleck	The Mall; 40.770740°N 73.972117°W	Cast in 1876; dedicated in 1877; James Wilson Alexander MacDonald, sculptor.	A bronze statue atop a Westerly granite pedestal, dedicated to a poet and literary critic. IAS Number: 76003506
Statue of Alexander Hamilton	East Drive, west of the Metropolitan Museum. 40.780807°N 73.964946°W	Dedicated in 1880; Carl Conrads, sculptor; New England Granite Works. Donated by John Church Hamilton, a son of the subject.	A statue of a Founding Father sculpted in Westerly granite atop a pedestal of the same material, standing in a grove of apple trees. IAS Number: 76002763
Bust of Victor Herbert	The Mall, opp. the bandstand. 40.772847°N 73.972061°W	Installed in 1927; Edmond Thomas Quinn, sculptor.	A bronze sculpture atop a Stony Creek granite pedestal, dedicated to the Irish-American composer. IAS Number: 76003508
Honey Bear	Central Park Zoo, north of the Delacorte Musical Clock. 40.768248°N 73.971139°W	Installed in 1937; Frederick Roth, sculptor; Roman Bronze Works, foundry. Relocated in 1988.	A bronze statue in the Central Park zoo, set into a niche, functioning as a fountain. IAS Number: 76003480
Bust of Alexander von Humboldt	Explorers Gate, Central Park West opp. 77th St. 40.779476°N 73.973285°W	Dedicated on September 14, 1869. Gustav Blaeser, sculptor; cast by Georg Ferdinand Howaldt, Braunschweig. Relocated in 1981.	A bronze sculpture atop a Westerly granite plinth, donated by an association of German-Americans. It originally stood at Fifth Ave. near 59th St. IAS Number: 76008978
Richard Morris Hunt Memorial	Fifth Ave. opp. 70th St. 40.7715°N 73.9679°W	Commissioned in 1896; dedicated on October 31, 1898; allegorical figures added 1901. Daniel Chester French, sculptor; Bruce Price, architect; Henry-Bonnard Bronze Co., foundry.	A bronze bust of the architect in a granite exedra with marble columns. Two bronze allegorical statues represent (right) Architecture and (left) Painting and Sculpture. IAS Number: 76006062
Waldo Hutchins Memorial Bench	Fifth Ave. opp. 72nd St. 40.772778°N 73.967222°W	Installed in 1932; Eric Gugler, architect; Paul Manship, sculptor.	There is a small sundial at the center of the bench. IAS Number: 76003511
Indian Hunter	66th St., west of The Mall. 40.770417°N 73.973133°W	Cast in 1866; dedicated in 1869. John Quincy Adams Ward, sculptor; L. A. Amouroux, foundry.	A bronze sculpture of a Native American man and his dog, atop a granite pedestal — the first work of an American sculptor to be installed in Central Park. IAS Number: 76003513
King Jagiello Monument	79th St., east of Turtle Pond; 40.778889°N 73.966667°W	Modeled in 1908–09; cast in 1939; Stanislaw Kazimierz Ostrowski, sculptor. Installed in Central Park in 1945; Aymar Embury II, architect.	A bronze equestrian statue of a Polish king, set atop a granite pedestal, cast for the Polish Pavilion at the 1939 New York World's Fair, and said to be the largest sculpture in Central Park. IAS Number: 87870164
Kilmer Memorial Plaque	West of the Mall; 40.7714117°N 73.9727411°W	Designer and date of installation unknown.	A bronze plaque in memory of the poet Joyce Kilmer, set into a cast-stone plinth.
Knights of Pythias Memorial (World War I memorial)	Memorial Grove.		A 42" high, 48" wide Barre light gray granite monument.
Statue of Fred Lebow	Onassis Reservoir Jogging Track, East Drive opp. 90th St. 40.784064°N 73.959127°W	Unveiled in 1994; Jesus Ygnacio Dominguez, sculptor; relocated in 2001.	A bronze statue on a granite base, dedicated to a founder of the New York City Marathon, placed each November near the marathon finish line.
Lehman Gates	Children's Zoo, 72nd Street Entrance; 40.768611°N 73.970972°W	Dedicated in 1961; Edward Coe Embury, architect; Paul Manship, sculptor; Roman Bronze Works, foundry.	A bronze sculptural fantasia depicting children and animals set atop three Swensons green granite piers. Three bronze commemorative plaques are mounted on the piers. IAS Number: 76007112
Levy Gate	Pat Hoffman Friedman Playground near Fifth Ave. & 79th St.	Cast ca 1957; dedicated in 1958; John Wilson, architect; Walter Beretta, sculptor. Relocated in 1989.	A bronze gate embellished with sculptures of monkeys, owls, and squirrels. IAS Number: 87870242
Sophie Irene Loeb Memorial Fountain	Fifth Ave., bet. 76th & 77th Streets; 40.775781°N 73.965113°W	Unveiled in 1936; Frederick Roth, sculptor; C. Dale Badgeley, architect.	A granite pier in a cast concrete basin, embellished with characters from Alice in Wonderland. Funded by August Heckscher. IAS Number: 76003525
Lombard Lamp	East Drive & 60th Street	Carl Borner, sculptor. Original created in 1869; This version cast ca 1979; dedicated on March 1, 1979.	A cast-iron and aluminum street light, a gift from the City of Hamburg, Germany.
Equestrian statue of José Martí	At Central Park South opp. Avenue of the Americas. 40.766043°N 73.976156°W	Anna Hyatt Huntington, sculptor; Domico Scoma Bronze Works, foundry Cast in 1959; dedicated in 1965.	A bronze equestrian statue atop a Barre granite pedestal. IAS Number: 87870168
Martin Memorial Birdbath	Central Park Zoo	Oronzio Maldarelli, sculptor; dedicated in 1942.	A bird bath sculpted with Colorado black marble and Colorado white marble, in memory of Edith Deacon Martin.
Bust of Giuseppe Mazzini	Sheep Meadow, West Drive, near 67th Street; 40.772867°N 73.976667°W	Giovanni Turini, sculptor; F. Matriati, architect; George Fischer & Brother, foundry. Unveiled in 1878.	A bronze bust atop a Westerly granite pedestal. The poet William Cullen Bryant delivered an address at the sculpture's unveiling. IAS Number: 87870169
John Purroy Mitchel Memorial	Engineers Gate, Fifth Ave., opp. 90th St. 40.784367°N 73.959167°W	Adolph A. Weinman, sculptor; Thomas Hastings, architect; Donn Barber, architect. Proposed in 1918; commissioned in 1921; dedicated November 14, 1928; bust repaired in 1966.	A gilded bronze bust, mounted on a black slate panel, set within a North Jay granite aedicula. Mitchel was the youngest mayor in New York City history, serving from 1914 to 1917. After losing re-election, and after America entered World War I, he enlisted the US Army aviation service but died in a training accident in Louisiana. IAS Number: 76003532
Bust of Thomas Moore	East Drive, bet. 60th & 61st Streets; 40.765556°N 73.973333°W	Dennis B. Sheahan, sculptor; George Fischer & Bros., foundry. Dedicated in 1879.	A bronze bust atop a Conway green granite pedestal, in memory of the Irish poet Thomas Moore (1779–1852). IAS Number: 76002891
Statue of Samuel Finley Breese Morse	Fifth Ave. opp. 72nd St. 40.7725°N 73.967306°W	Byron M. Pickett, sculptor; cast by Maurice J. Power, National Fine Art Foundry. Commissioned in 1870; dedicated in 1871.	A bronze statue on a Quincy granite pedestal, created in honor of Morse and his contribution to telegraphic communication. IAS Number: 76003533
Mother Goose	Entrance to Rumsey Play Field; 40.772439°N 73.969504°W	Frederick Roth, sculptor. Installed in 1938.	A granite sculpture, portraying the famous story-book character atop a flying goose, with bas relief panels illustrating Humpty Dumpty and Old King Cole, among others. IAS Number: 76003534
William Church Osborn Gates	Entrance to Ancient Playground, Fifth Ave., bet. 84th & 85th Streets; 40.780728°N 73.961146°W	Paul Manship, sculptor; Aymar Embury II, architect. Cast in 1952; dedicated in 1953.	Bronze gates embellished with plants and animals, mounted onto Minnesota Mahogany granite piers. Two sculptures, one of bears, the other of elk, mounted on Cold Spring granite bases, sit atop each pier. The gates were dedicated to Osborn, a civic leader and 8th president of the Metropolitan Museum of Art. IAS Number: 76007113
The Pilgrim	Pilgrim Hill, 72nd Street; 40.77315°N 73.968553°W	John Quincy Adams Ward, sculptor; Richard Morris Hunt, architect; Henry Bonnard Bronze Company, foundry; cast in 1884; dedicated in 1885.	IAS Number: 87870161
Pomona	Pulitzer Fountain, Grand Army Plaza; Fifth Ave. at 59th St. 40.76403°N 73.97361°W	Karl Bitter, sculptor of Pomona; Thomas Hastings, architect of the fountain and plaza; Karl Gruppe, sculptor; Orazio Piccirilli, sculptor (horns of plenty); Isidore Konti, carver of final model. Commissioned in 1898; dedicated in 1916.	Following Bitter's death in 1915, Gruppe and Konti completed the statue of Pomona. IAS Number: 76003537
Romeo and Juliet	Delacorte Theater; 40.78056°N 73.968754°W	Cast in 1978; installed in 1978: Milton Hebald, sculptor; Spartaco Dionesi Foundry.	IAS Number: 87870172
The Rowers	Central Park Boathouse; 40.775278°N 73.96875°W	Irwin Glusker, sculptor; commissioned in 1968; dedicated in 1971.	A bronze sculpture dedicated to the memory of Carl and Adeline Loeb, who funded the Central Park Boathouse. IAS Number: 87870241
Rumsey Tablet	Gateway to Mary Harriman Rumsey Playground; 40.772435°N 73.969588°W	Installed in 1937; unknown sculptor.	IAS Number: 76003539.
Equestrian statue of José de San Martín	Central Park South, opp. Ave. of the Americas. 40.7660146°N 73.9765739°W	Original dedicated in Buenos Aires in 1862; Louis Joseph Daumas, sculptor. This version dedicated in 1951; Clarke, Rapuano & Holleran, architect of pedestal.	A bronze sculpture atop a black granite pedestal, a copy of Louis Joseph Daumas's 1862 sculpture. IAS Number: 87870167
Bust of Friedrich von Schiller	Poets Walk, along The Mall. 40.773194°N 73.971831°W	Charles Ludwig Richter, sculptor; dedicated in 1859; relocated in 1955.	A bronze bust atop a Saguenan granite pedestal, it was the first sculpture to be installed in Central Park. IAS Number: 76003543
Statue of Sir Walter Scott	Literary Walk, south end of The Mall. 40.770071°N 73.972422°W	Sir John Steell, sculptor; original ca 1845; cast in 1871; dedicated in 1872.	IAS Number: 76003545
Seventh Regiment Memorial (Civil War memorial)	West Drive, opp. the Sheep Meadow. 40.773757°N 73.976403°W	Commissioned in 1869; dedicated in 1874. John Quincy Adams Ward, sculptor; Richard Morris Hunt, architect; Robert Wood & Company, foundry.	A bronze statue atop a Barre granite base. IAS Number: 87870170
Statue of William Shakespeare	The Mall, near 67th St. 40.769862°N 73.972474°W	Proposed in 1864, the 300th anniversary of the poet's birth; commissioned in 1870; cast in 1871; dedicated in 1872. John Quincy Adams Ward, sculptor; Robert Wood & Company, foundry; Jacob Wrey Mould, architect of base; Henry Parry, carver of base.	A bronze statue on a granite pedestal, funded by a benefit performance of Shakespeare's Julius Caesar on November 25, 1864 at The Winter Garden Theatre starring Edwin Booth, Junius Brutus Booth Jr., and John Wilkes Booth. The statue is the second of Ward's four in Central Park. IAS Number: 65700009
Sherman Memorial aka William Tecumseh Sherman	Grand Army Plaza, Fifth Ave. & Central Park South. 40.76472°N 73.97322°W	Commissioned in 1892; dedicated on May 30, 1903; gilded in 1903; Augustus Saint-Gaudens, sculptor; A. Phimister Proctor, sculptor (horse); Charles Follen McKim, architect of pedestal; Norcross Brothers, contractor; gilded in 1903; relocated fifteen feet west in 1913; regilded in 1989 and 2013.	IAS Number: 76003547
Sisters of Charity Plaque	West of the Conservatory Garden, on axis of 106th St. 40.7944936°N 73.952375°W	Plaque dedicated in 1995.	The plaque memorializes Mount St. Vincent Academy, a convent and school run by the Sisters of Charity of New York. The building was converted into a military hospital during the Civil War, and demolished in 1917.
Snowbabies	Gateway to Mary Harriman Rumsey Playground; 40.772435°N 73.969588°W	Installed in 1938; Victor Frisch, sculptor	Cast stone sculptures atop gate piers. IAS Number: 76003550
William T. Stead Memorial	Fifth Ave., opp. 91st St. 40.784753°N 73.958117°W	George Frampton, sculptor; Thomas Hastings, architect; original dedicated in London in 1913; this second version dedicated in 1920.	A bronze plaque mounted on Indiana limestone, a copy of the 1913 Stead Memorial in London. Stead was a British journalist who died in the sinking of the RMS Titanic. IAS Number: 76003551
Still Hunt	East Drive. 40.776741°N 73.967304°W	Edward Kerneys, sculptor; M. J. Power Bronze, foundry; commissioned in 1881; installed in 1883.	A bronze statue of an American panther on a bronze base, mounted on a rock ledge in a realistic mode. IAS Number: 76003552
Charles B. Stover Memorial Bench aka Whisper Bench	Shakespeare Garden. 40.780022°N 73.969337°W	Unknown sculptor; installed in 1935; dedicated on November 5, 1936.	A curved, twenty-foot long exedra of Deer Isle granite. Stover was Parks Commissioner from 1910 to 1913. IAS Number: 76003553
Strawberry Fields	West 72nd St. & Terrace Drive. 40.775735°N 73.975205°W	Dedicated in 1985; designed by Bruce R. Kelly, landscape architect.	A five-acre landscape designed as a memorial to John Lennon, the member of the musical group The Beatles. The memorial's centerpiece "Imagine" mosaic was created by masons in Naples, Italy, who donated it to Central Park.
Sundial	Shakespeare Garden.	Installed in 1945; Walter Beretta, sculptor.	A bronze sundial mounted on a cast-stone pedestal.
The Tempest or Prospero and Miranda The sculpture is at left.	Delacorte Theater. 40.780531°N 73.968626°W	Milton Hebald, sculptor; A. Ottavino Corp., foundry. Commissioned in 1966; dedicated in 1973.	A companion piece to Romeo and Juliet. IAS Number: 87870171
Statue of Albert Bertel Thorvaldsen	East side, between 96th & 97th Streets. 40.788608°N 73.956005°W	Albert Bertel Thorvaldsen, sculptor; Lauritz Rasmussen, Copenhagen, foundry. Cast in 1892; dedicated in 1894.	A bronze copy after the Danish sculptor's 1839 marble self-portrait (Thorvaldsen Museum, Copenhagen). Commissioned by the United Danes, Norwegians and Swedes of New York and Brooklyn to commemorate the 50th anniversary of Thorvaldsen's death, it is the only statue of an artist displayed in any New York City park. IAS Number: 76003556
Tigress and Cubs	Central Park Zoo. 40.767389°N 73.972448°W	Auguste Cain, sculptor; F. Barbedienne, foundry. Cast in 1866; dedicated in 1867.	IAS number: 76003557
Untermyer Fountain aka Fountain of the Three Dancing Maidens	Conservatory Garden. 40.79426°N 73.95195°W	Walter Schott, sculptor; H. Gladenbeck & Son, foundry. Cast ca 1910; dedicated in 1947.	One of three castings donated by the family of Samuel Untermyer. The first cast was made in Germany about 1910 and won a Gold Medal at the Brussels World's Fair. Subsequently, two more full-size casts were made, including this one. IAS Number: 87870166
USS Maine National Monument Columbia Triumphant	At Columbus Circle. 40.768242°N 73.981012°W	Attilio Piccirilli, sculptor; Harold Van Buren Magonigle, architect. Commissioned in 1901; dedicated in 1913.	IAS Number: 76003528
USS Maine Memorial Tablet	USS Maine National Monument	Charles Keck, sculptor. Cast in 1913; installed in 1936.	Cast of metal from the destroyed battleship. IAS Number: 76003527
Vanderbilt Gate	Fifth Ave., between 104th and 105th Streets. 40.793511°N 73.951882°W	Designed by George B. Post, architect; fabricator unknown.	One of a pair of 16 foot-tall gates that once opened into the entrance court of the Cornelius Vanderbilt II residence. Fabricated in Paris of wrought iron with cast bronze scrollwork and ornamentation. Installed on 58th Street at Fifth Avenue in 1893; removed and stored in 1928; installation in Central Park completed on May 13, 1939. IAS Number: 76003559
Statue of Daniel Webster	West 72nd Street & West Drive; 40.77475°N 73.97412°W	Thomas Ball, sculptor; statue cast in Munich in 1876; dedicated in 1876.	A larger-than-life bronze statue on a Quincy granite pedestal depicting a 19th-century American statesman, donated to the city in 1876 by Gordon W. Burnham. The plinth is inscribed with some of Webster's famous quotes: LIBERTY AND UNION, NOW AND FOREVER, ONE AND INSEPARABLE. IAS Number: 76004876
Women's Rights Pioneers Monument	Literary Walk.	Sculpted by Meredith Bergmann. Dedicated on August 26, 2020.	A bronze sculpture portraying suffragists Susan B. Anthony, Elizabeth Cady Stanton, and Sojourner Truth; the first in Central Park to depict real women.

=== Public art in Central Park now removed ===
Name	Location / GPS Coordinates	Dates & Designers	Notes
Auld Lang Syne aka "Tam O'Shanter and Souter Johnnie"	5th Avenue, by the Casino.	Robert Thomson [Thompson?], sculptor; carved in 1862; dedicated in 1866; moved to storage; damaged in a fire 1881.	
Equestrian statue of Simón Bolívar	Central Park West & 83rd Street	Installed in 1884; R. de la Cora [sic. Rafael de la Cova], sculptor.	The statue was removed by the 1890s. A proposed replacement by Giovanni Turini, to be placed on the same base, was rejected in 1897. The current statue, by Sally James Farnham, was installed in 1921.
Bust of Miguel de Cervantes		Fernando Miranda y Casellas, sculptor. Modeled ca 1878; installed by 1892; removed after 1918.	Sketch of the unexecuted Cervantes Monument (1878).
Commerce	8th Avenue, near 59th Street	Installed 1865.	
Shepard Fountain (destroyed)	East Drive, opposite 78th Street	Olin Levi Warner, sculptor; Unknown carver. Dedicated in 1891 (Union Square); Moved to Central Park ca 1898; destroyed in 1953.	The marble drinking fountain was first installed in Union Square, where it was vandalized. It was moved to Central Park about 1898, but deteriorated, and was removed in 1953. IAS Number: 88100201
Dr. J. Marion Sims Memorial	On Fifth Avenue opp. 103rd St. 40.792489°N 73.952641°W	Ferdinand von Miller II, sculptor; Aymar Embury II, architect. Cast in 1892; dedicated in 1894; removed in 2018.	Sims used enslaved women for his gynecological research. The memorial became controversial in the 2000s when this became widely publicized. The statue was removed on April 17, 2018, and will be relocated to Green-Wood Cemetery in Brooklyn, where Sims is buried. IAS Number: 76003548
Swan and Cygnet aka Boy with Swan	"near 5th Avenue entrance"	Theodor Kalide, sculptor; original 1834 (Germany); donated in 1863.	Kalide's Boy with Swan was placed in the Charlottenburg Palace Gardens in Berlin in 1849. 1863 Annual Report: "Feb. 28. One Bronze Fountain—Boy and Swan—presented by Thomas Richardson, Esq."

=== Temporary installations of public art ===
Name	Location / GPS Coordinates	Dates & Designers	Notes
Volatile Presence; Valley Marker; Interrupted Messenger; Measured Presence	Central Park Plaza	Beverly Pepper, sculptor, 1983.	IAS Numbers: 87480101; 87480102; 87480103; 87480104
The Gates	7,503 "gates" on 23 miles (37 km) of pathways, throughout the park.	Christo and Jeanne-Claude, artists. Proposed in 1979; installed February 12–27, 2005.	The Gates was meant to evoke the procession of Japanese gateways leading to Shinto shrines. IAS Number: 71500738
V W X Yellow Elephant Underwear / H I J Kiddy Elephant Underwear	Doris Freedman Plaza; 5th Avenue & 60th Street	Chinatsu Ban, sculptor, April 8 – July 24, 2005.	
Circle of Animals/Zodiac Heads	Pulitzer Fountain; 5th Avenue & 59th Street; 40.76403°N 73.97361°W	Ai Weiwei, sculptor, May 4 – July 15, 2011.	
How I Roll	Doris Freedman Plaza; 5th Avenue & 60th Street	Paola Pivi, artist, June 20 – July 18, 2012.	The Piper Seneca would slowly rotate head-over-tail. YouTube video. The sculpture was scheduled to be exhibited until August 26, but mechanical problems caused it to be removed in July.
