= Louis-Joseph Daumas =

French sculptor

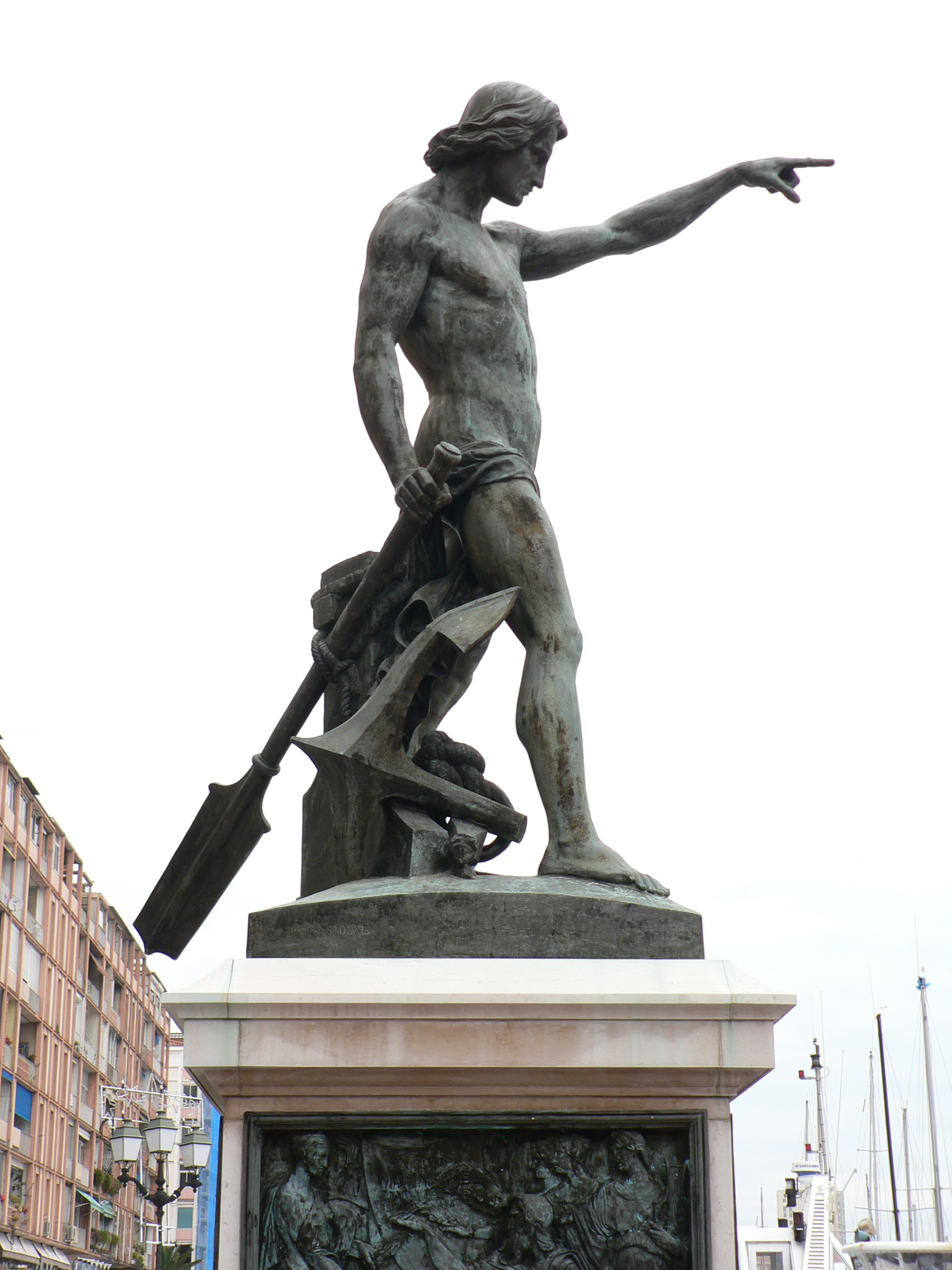
Genius of Navigation, Toulon

Louis-Joseph Daumas (1801–1887) was a French sculptor and medallist.

Born in Toulon, Daumas was admitted into the École nationale supérieure des Beaux-Arts in 1826, and entered the atelier of David d'Angers.

Daumas's work includes:

- Genius of Navigation, bronze statue of French Admiral Jules de Cuverville with four bas-reliefs on the base, port of Toulon, 1847, reconstructed after its destruction in World War II
- exterior statue of François Eudes de Mézeray, Cour Napoléon in the Louvre, Paris, prior to 1853
- Roman cavalier and his horse, on the left bank of the Pont d'Iéna, Paris, 1853
- equestrian statue of José de San Martín in the Plaza San Martín of Buenos Aires, 1862, with copies at the Parque del Oeste in Madrid, Central Park in New York City, and Parc Montsouris in Paris and in Washington, D.C., United States
- equestrian sculpture at the Sakıp Sabancı Museum, Istanbul, 1864
