= Statue of Walter Scott =

Statue of Walter Scott may refer to:

- Statue of Sir Walter Scott, Perth
- Statue of Walter Scott (New York City)
- Scott Monument, Edinburgh

== See also ==
- Scott Statue (disambiguation)
