= Samuel Morse (disambiguation) =

Samuel Morse (1791–1872) was an American painter and inventor.

Samuel Morse may also refer to:

- Samuel Finley Brown Morse (1885–1969), American environmental conservationist
- Samuel French Morse (1916–1985), American poet and teacher
- Samuel Finley Breese Morse (sculpture), 1871 sculpture depicting American painter and inventor Samuel Morse in New York City
- Samuel Morse (Dedham) (1585–1654), early settler of Dedham, Massachusetts

== See also ==
- Samuel Morss (1852–1903), American journalist
