= Scott Statue =

Scott Statue may refer to:

- Equestrian statue of Winfield Scott, Washington, D.C.
- Statue of Harvey W. Scott, Portland, Oregon
- Statue of Robert Falcon Scott, Christchurch

== See also ==
- Statue of Walter Scott (disambiguation)
