= Irwin Glusker =

American art director (1924–2022)

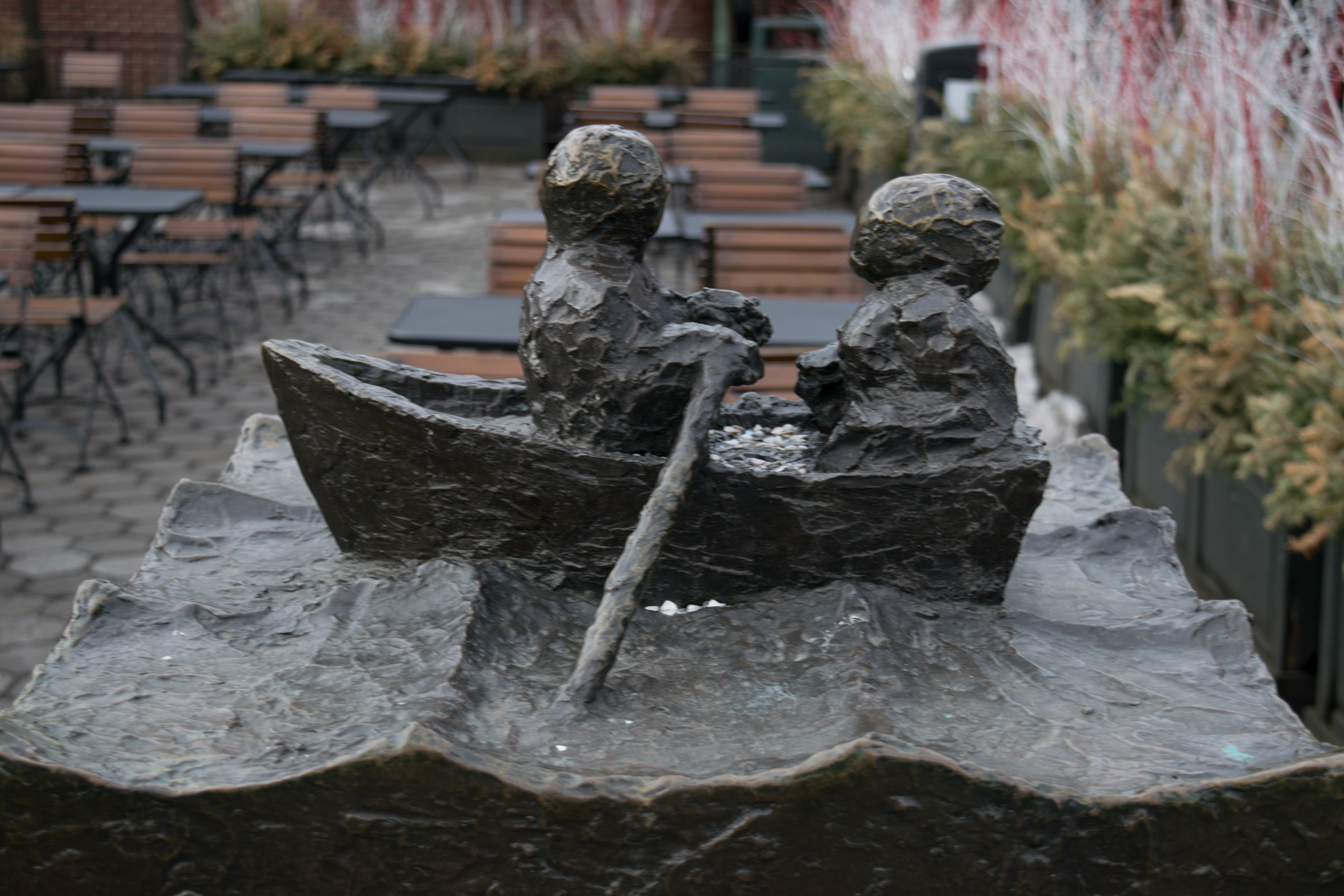
- Glusker's design of the Central Park Boathouse Dedicatory Sculpture in 2019
- Born: June 8, 1924; Brooklyn, New York, U.S.
- Died: August 30, 2022 (aged 98); Manhattan, New York, U.S.
- Education: Cooper Union
- Occupation: Art director
- Spouse: Lilyan Glusker (died. 2022)
- Children: 2

Irwin Glusker (June 8, 1924 – August 30, 2022) was an American art director.

== Life and career ==
Glusker was born in Brooklyn, New York, the son of Ida Schmitt, a dressmaker and Hyman Glusker, a shoemaker. He attended Boys High School, and went on to attend Cooper Union. He joined the United States Army at the age of 18, serving as a private. Glusker was discharged from the army and returned to New York in 1948.

In 1967, Glusker designed the Central Park Boathouse Dedicatory Sculpture, which is also known as The Rowers.

Glusker worked for American Heritage, and was the art director for Life magazine. He then established his own design business and produced numerous books for singer and actor Frank Sinatra and other celebrities.

In 1986, Glusker wrote a memoir about his life and career. He died in August 2022 at his home in Manhattan, New York, at the age of 98.
