= King Jagiello Monument =

Equestrian statue in New York City

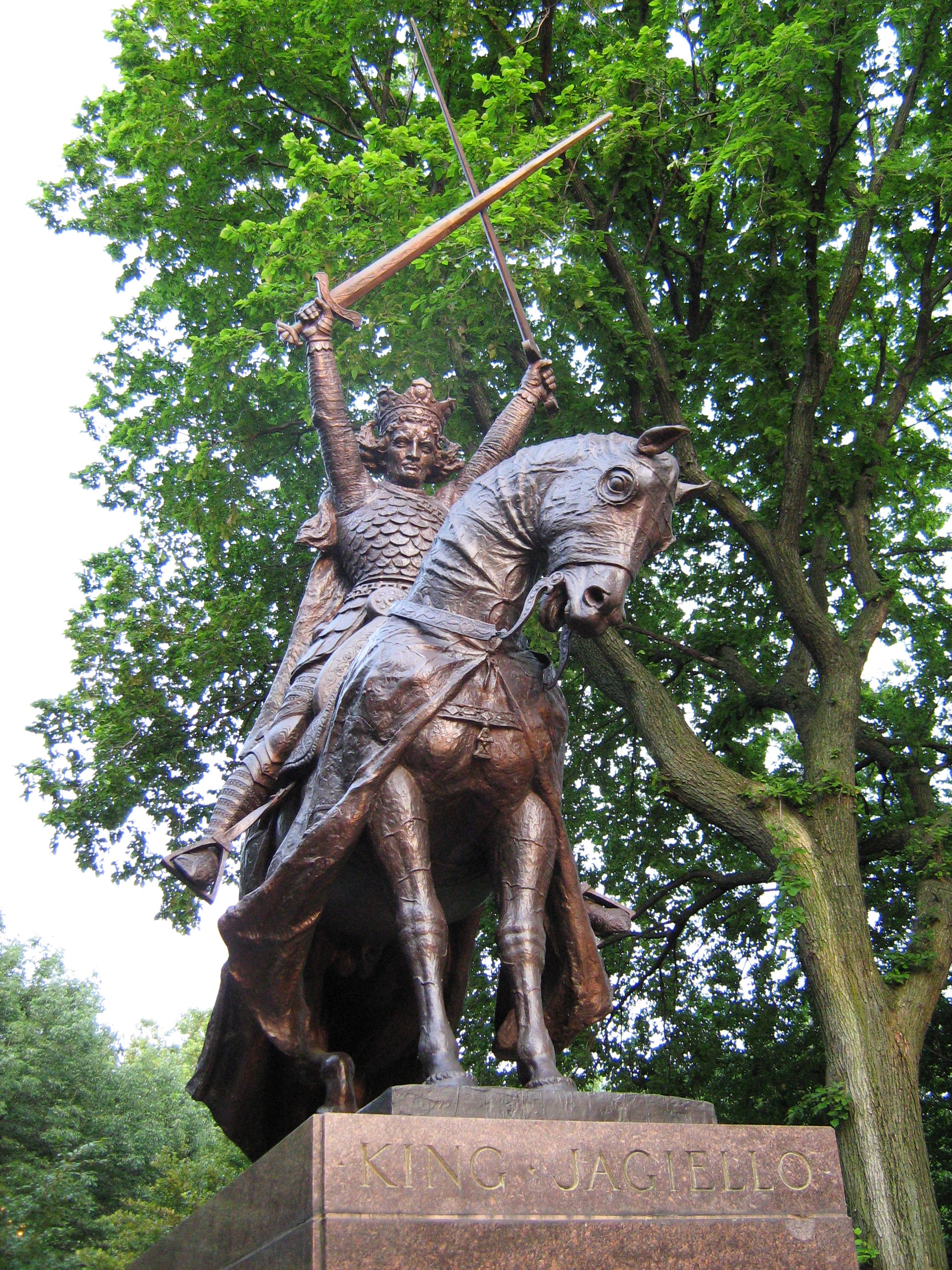
- The King Jagiello Monument in 2010.
- Interactive map of King Jagiello Monument
- Location: Central Park, New York City, New York, United States
- Coordinates: 40°46′44″N 73°58′0″W
- Designer: Stanisław K. Ostrowski
- Type: Equestrian statue
- Material: bronze
- Height: 7 m (23 ft)
- Opening date: 1939
- Dedicated to: Władysław II Jagiełło

The King Jagiełło Monument (Polish: Pomnik Króla Jagiełły) is an equestrian monument of Władysław II Jagiełło, King of Poland and Grand Duke of Lithuania, located in Central Park, New York City.

The monument commemorates the Battle of Grunwald, a decisive defeat of the Teutonic Order in 1410. Initially made by Stanisław K. Ostrowski for the Polish 1939 New York World's Fair pavilion, the monument was permanently installed in Central Park in 1945. Raised on its grand plinth, it is one of the park's most prominently cited and impressive among the twenty-nine sculptures.

== Description ==
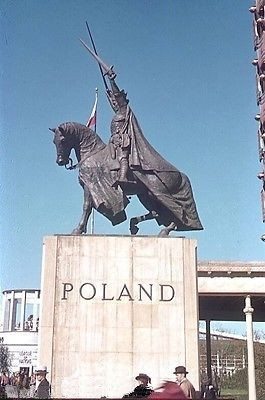
The monument in 1939

The monument is sited overlooking the east end of the Turtle Pond, across from Belvedere Castle, and just southeast from the Great Lawn. To the northeast is Cleopatra's Needle and beyond, the Metropolitan Museum of Art.

The monument commemorates the Battle of Grunwald (1410), where Polish and Lithuanian knights, supported by Ruthenian, Czech, and Tatar knights, defeated the Teutonic Order. King Władysław II Jagiełło is shown larger than life, seated on a horse holding two crossed swords over his head as a symbol of defiance and the union of Polish–Lithuanian forces. Known as the Grunwald Swords, they were the invitation to battle offered to the king and his ally Vytautas the Great in an ironic gesture by Ulrich von Jungingen, Grand Master of the Teutonic Order.

Parks Chief Consulting Architect Aymar Embury II (1880–1966) designed the massive granite pedestal. POLAND is inscribed on both sides of the plinth. Ostrowski's name is engraved in the front lower right-hand corner.

The inscription on the plinth of the King Jagiello monument reads:

King · Jagiello
Wladyslaw Jagiello
King of Poland
Grand Duke of Lithuania
1386–1434
Founder of a Free Union of the
Peoples of East-Central Europe
Victor Over the Teutonic
Aggressors at Grunwald
July 15 – 1410

== History ==
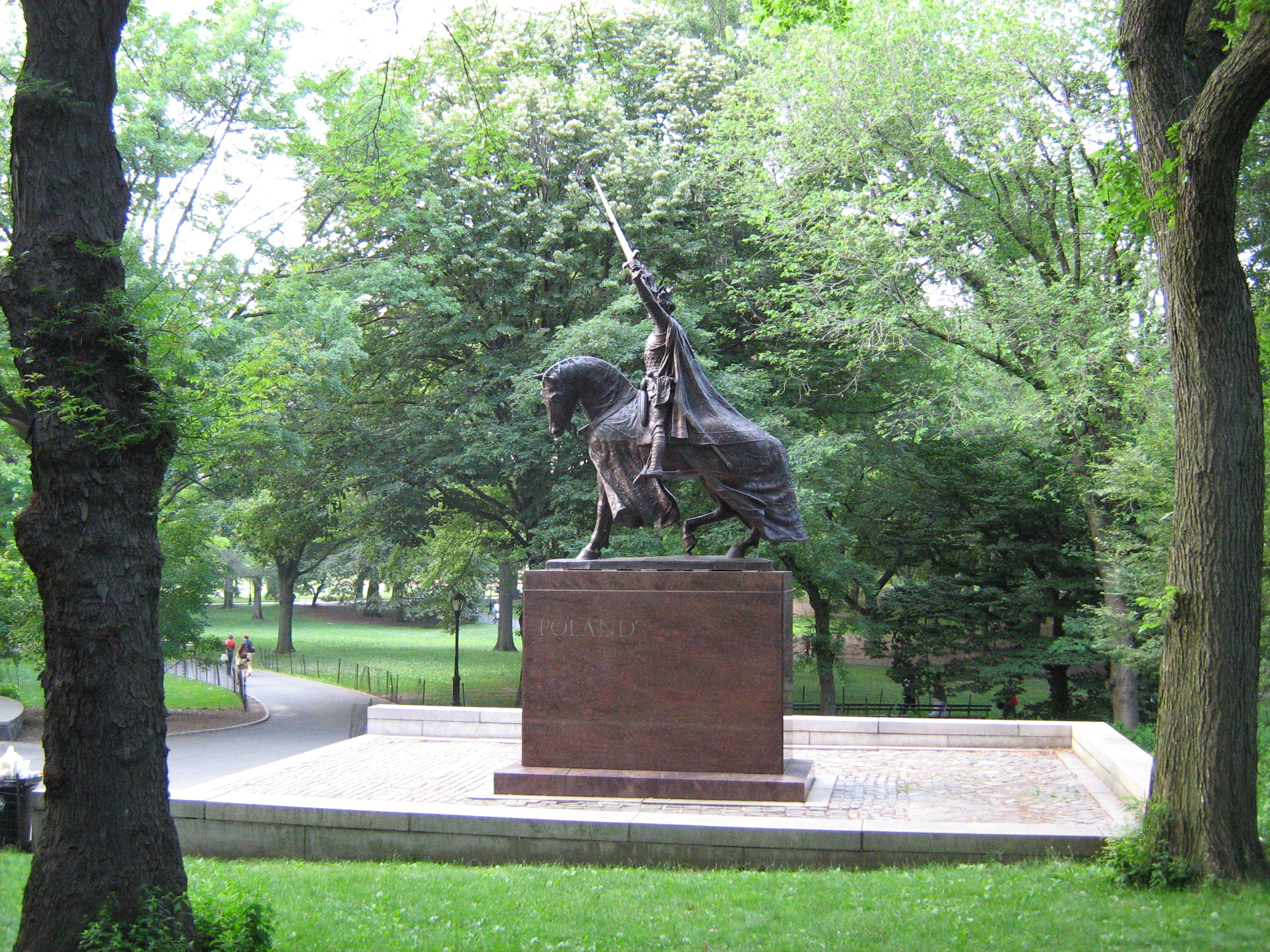
The monument and path by the pond

The bronze monument was created for the 1939 New York World's Fair's Polish pavilion by the Polish sculptor Stanisław K. Ostrowski (1879–1947). It stood at the Fair's entrance at Queens' Flushing Meadows-Corona Park. It is a replica of a King Jagiello memorial in Warsaw that was converted into bullets for World War II by the Germans after they entered and occupied the capital of Poland.

As a result of the German invasion of Poland that marked the beginning of the Second World War, the personnel and equipment of the Polish World's Fair pavilion were forced to remain in the United States. Unlike much of the rest of the pavilion, which was sold to the Polish Museum of America in Chicago, the monument stayed in New York, thanks in part to Mayor Fiorello H. La Guardia publicly lobbying to keep the statue.

The statue was presented to the City of New York by the King Jagiello Monument Committee, with support from the Polish government in exile on July 15, 1945, when it was permanently placed in Central Park with the cooperation of the last consul of the Second Polish Republic or pre-communist Poland in New York, count Józef Kazimierz Krasicki and unveiled by him. The event was a little over two months after Victory in Europe Day (May 8) and the 535th anniversary of the Battle of Grunwald.

The monument was conserved in 1986 by the Central Park Conservancy. Further conservation was completed in September 2016. The support structure, which attaches the monument to the granite base, was the major endeavor as well as the installation of a new stainless steel mounting system for the statue. Additional work included the restoration the statue's patina and protective coating.
