= Gabriel Koren =

Gabriel Koren is a Hungarian born American sculptor whose body of work focuses on noted and or celebrated African-American public figures.

She was born and raised in Budapest. Koren's works include the first public statue of Malcolm X, titled with his full Muslim name "El-Hajj Malik Shabazz, Malcolm X" (1997) and commissioned by the Percent for Art for and placed at the Audubon Ballroom in Manhattan where the Civil rights leader was assassinated, the statues of Frederick Douglass (2009) for the Frederick Douglass Memorial at Frederick Douglass Circle in Harlem commissioned by the New York City Department of Cultural Affairs and Percent for Art, and "Prudence Crandall with Student" (2008) in the Connecticut State Capitol.
