= Union Square Drinking Fountain =

Sculpture in Manhattan, New York, U.S.

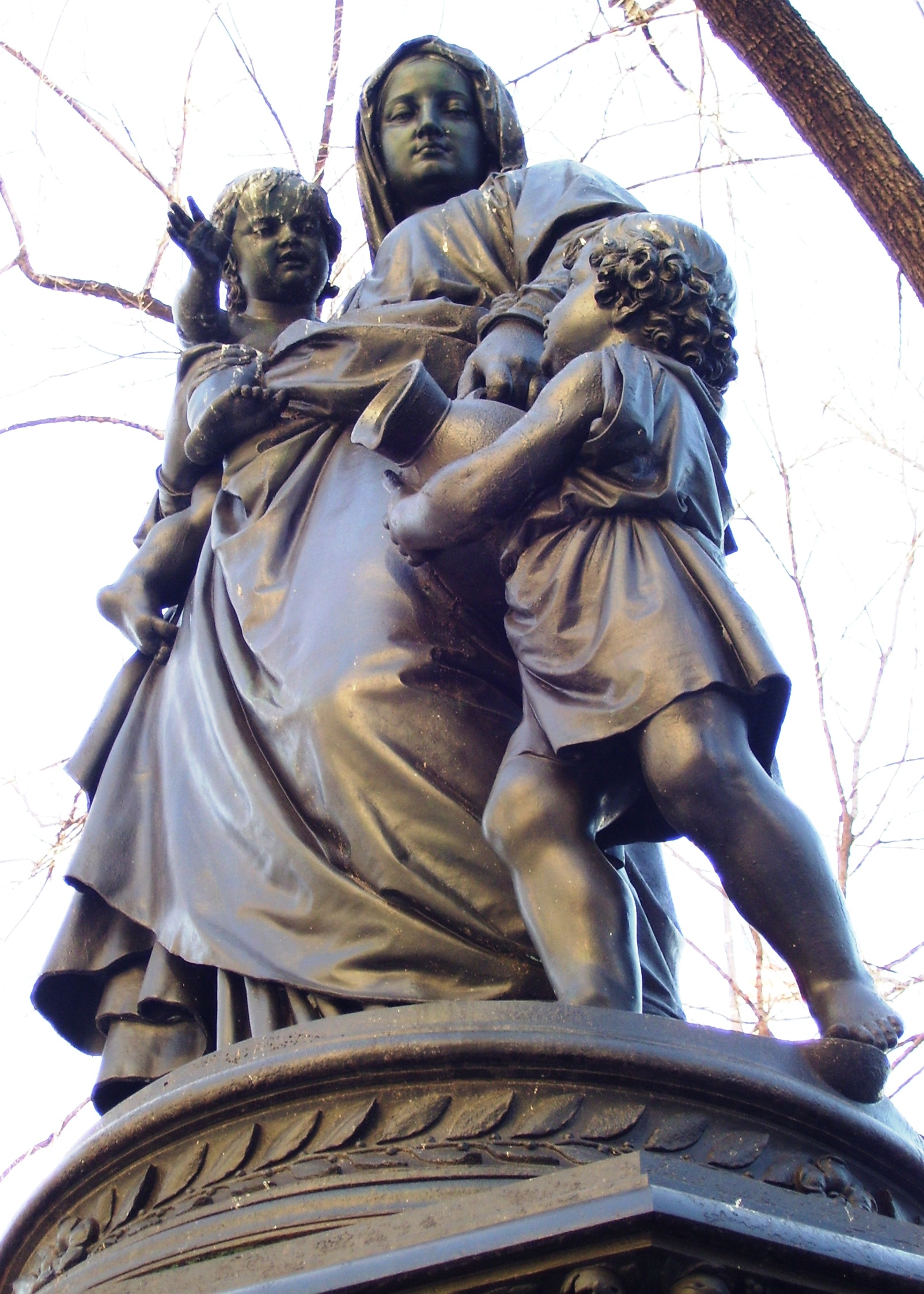
- The fountain in 2011
- Medium: Bronze sculpture
- Location: New York City, U.S.
- 40.7361°N 73.9908°W

Union Square Drinking Fountain, also known as James Fountain, is an outdoor bronze sculpture and ornamental fountain by sculptor Adolf von Donndorf and architect J. Leonard Corning, located on the west side of Union Square Park in Manhattan, New York City. Cast in 1881 and dedicated on October 25, 1881, it was donated by Daniel Willis James and Theodore Roosevelt Sr. "to promote public health as well as the virtue of charity". The statuary group includes a standing woman holding a baby in her right arm and a young child at her left side. They are set on an octagonal Swedish red granite pedestal with lion head fountains and basins on four of the sides.
