= Bust of Giuseppe Mazzini =

Sculpture in Manhattan, New York, U.S.

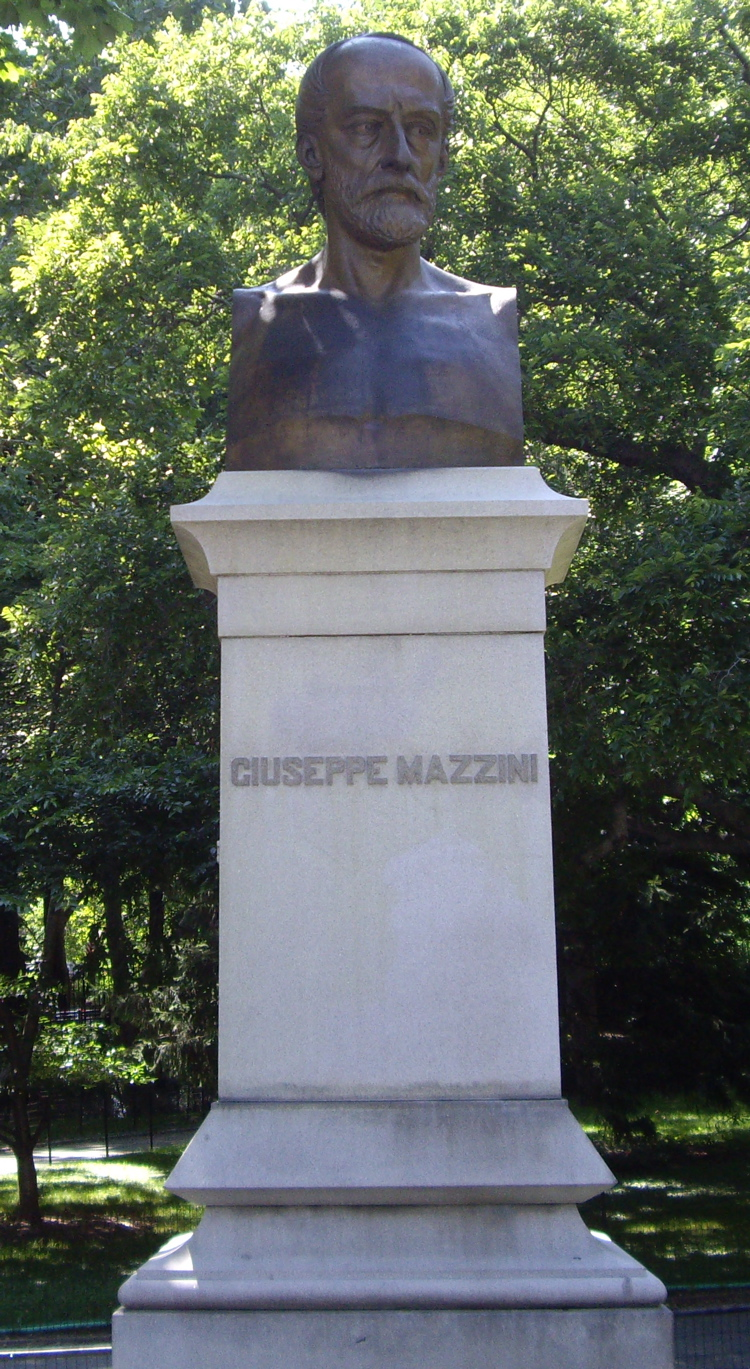
- The sculpture in 2007
- Year: 1878
- Type: Sculpture
- Medium: Bronze
- Subject: Giuseppe Mazzini
- Location: New York City, New York, United States; 40.772867°N 73.976667°W

An outdoor bronze bust of Giuseppe Mazzini by Giovanni Turini is installed in Central Park's Sheep Meadow, in Manhattan, New York. The sculpture was commissioned by a group of Italian-Americans and was dedicated in 1878 with a speech by American poet William Cullen Bryant. It sits on a granite pedestal, which includes two inscriptions that translate to "thought and action" and "God and the people". In 1994, the bust was restored by the Central Park Conservancy.
