= Burnett Memorial Fountain =

Fountain and sculpture in Manhattan, New York, U.S.

- The fountain in 2014
- Location: New York City, New York, U.S.; 40°47′35″N 73°57′10″W

Frances Hodgson Burnett Memorial Fountain, located near Fifth Avenue and the Museum of the City of New York in Manhattan's Central Park, is an outdoor bronze sculpture and fountain which serves as a memorial to Burnett, the author of several literary classics including The Secret Garden and Little Lord Fauntleroy.

== Description and history ==
Created by sculptor Bessie Potter Vonnoh in 1936 and dedicated on May 28, 1937, by Mayor Fiorello LaGuardia, it depicts Mary and Dickon from The Secret Garden.
