= Group of Bears =

Sculpture by Paul Manship

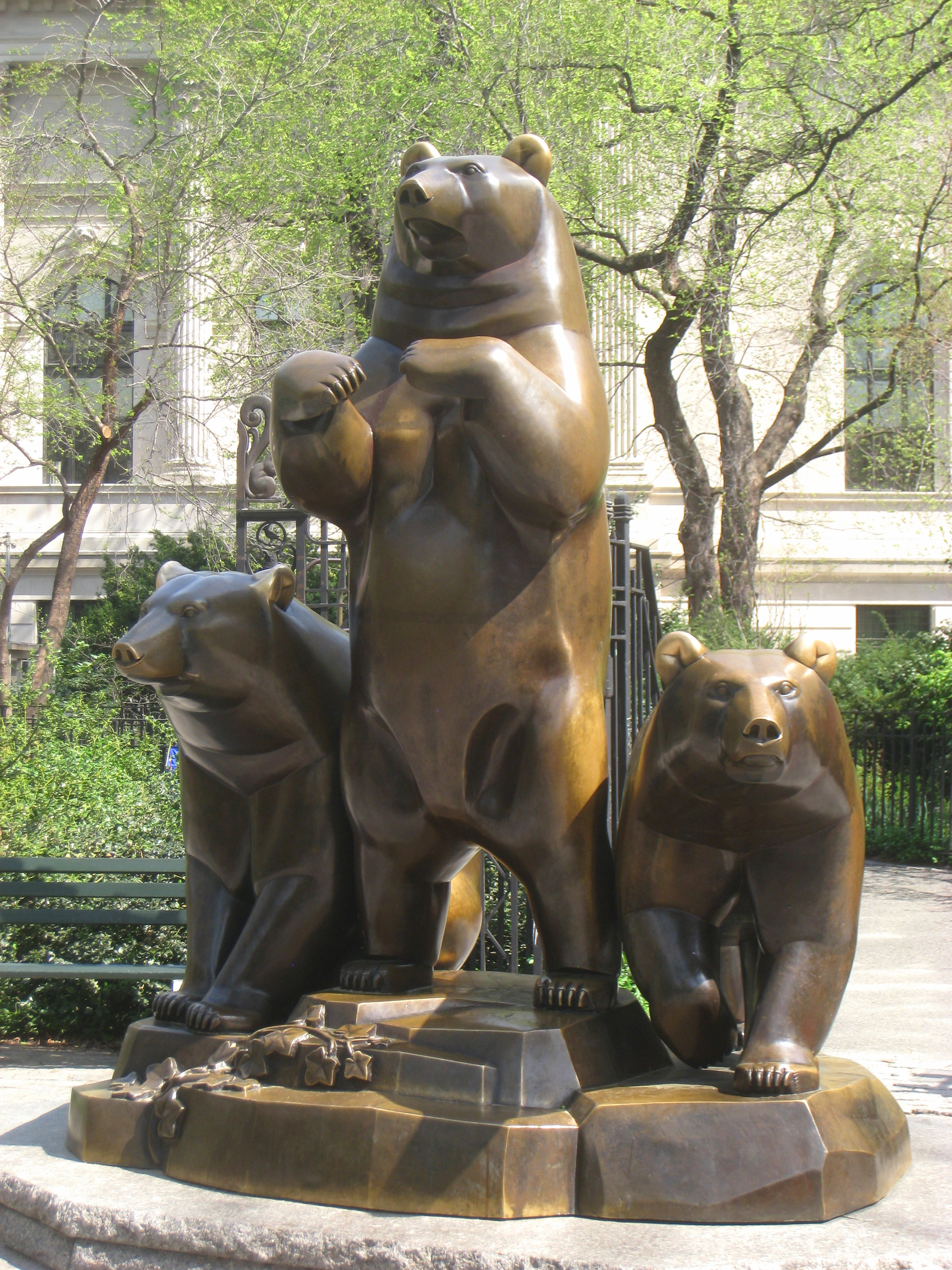
- The installation in Central Park

Group of Bears is a sculpture by Paul Manship.

The 1932 bronze sculpture in the Metropolitan Museum of Art's collection was cast in 1933 and measures 88 x 72 x 56 inches. The bronze sculpture at Pat Hoffman Friedman Playground, in Central Park, at Fifth Avenue and 79th Street, was cast in 1960 and unveiled on October 11, 1990. Other versions of the piece are featured on part of the William Church Osborn Gates (1952) at Central Park and the Paul J. Rainey Memorial Gates (1933) at the Bronx Zoo. Another cast of the work from 2008 can be found in Compton Gardens, in Bentonville, Arkansas. There is another cast of the work in Jerusalem Biblical Zoo.

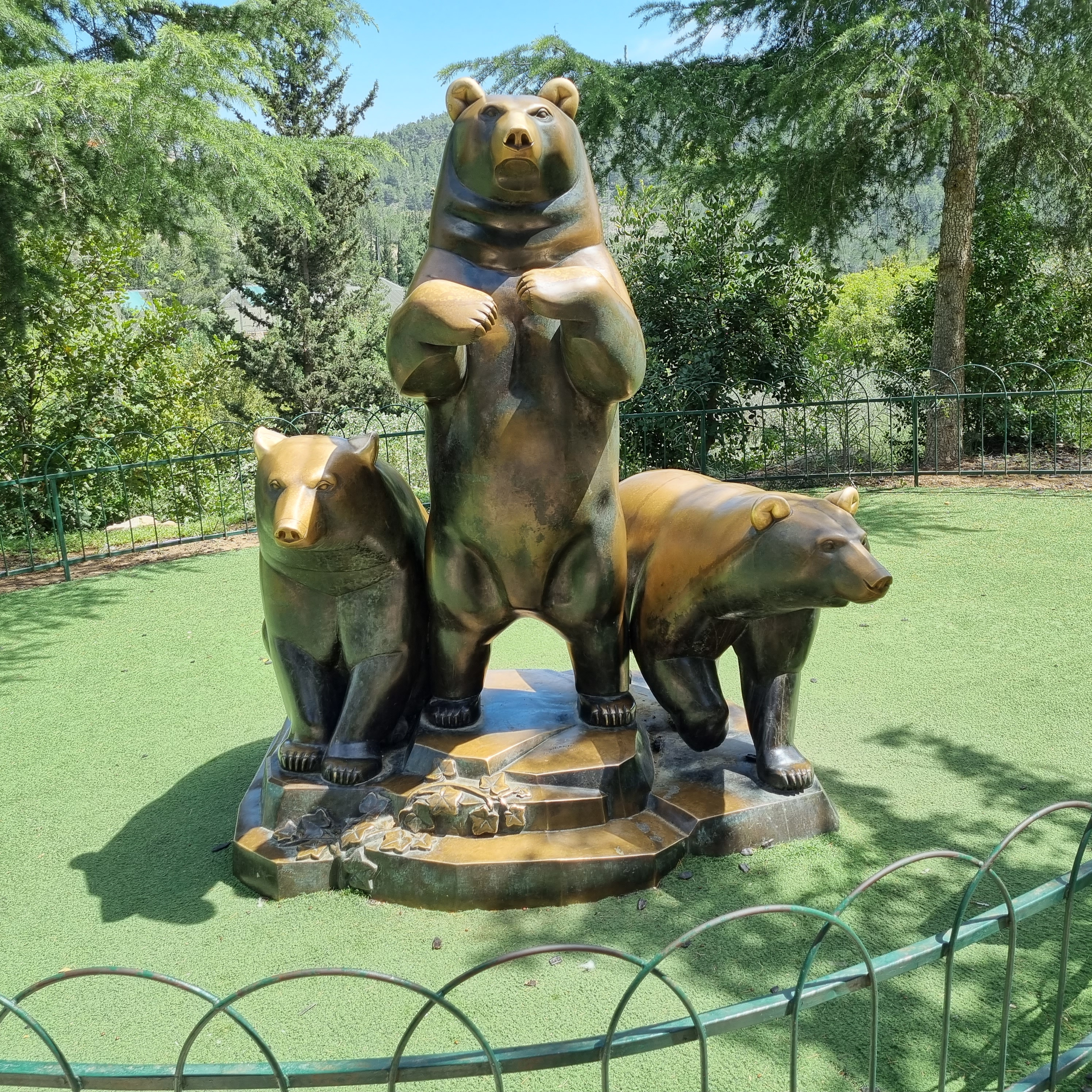
Group of Bears sculpture in Jerusalem Biblical Zoo

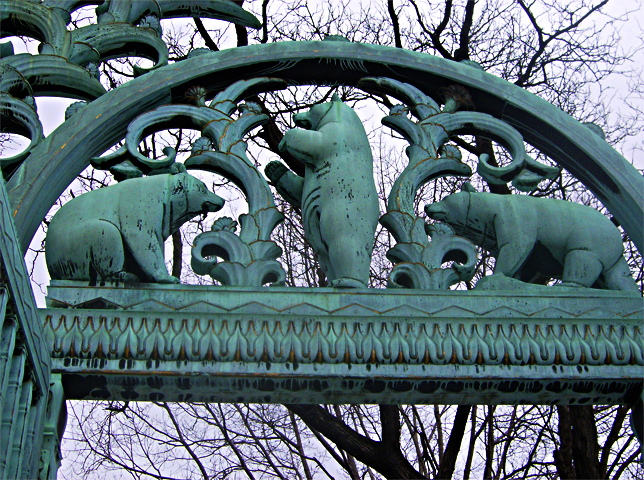
Sculpted bears on the Rainey Memorial Gate at the Bronx Zoo in Bronx, New York - Paul Manship 1933

== See also ==
- 1932 in art
