= Frederick Douglass Memorial =

Memorial and sculpture in Manhattan, New York, U.S.

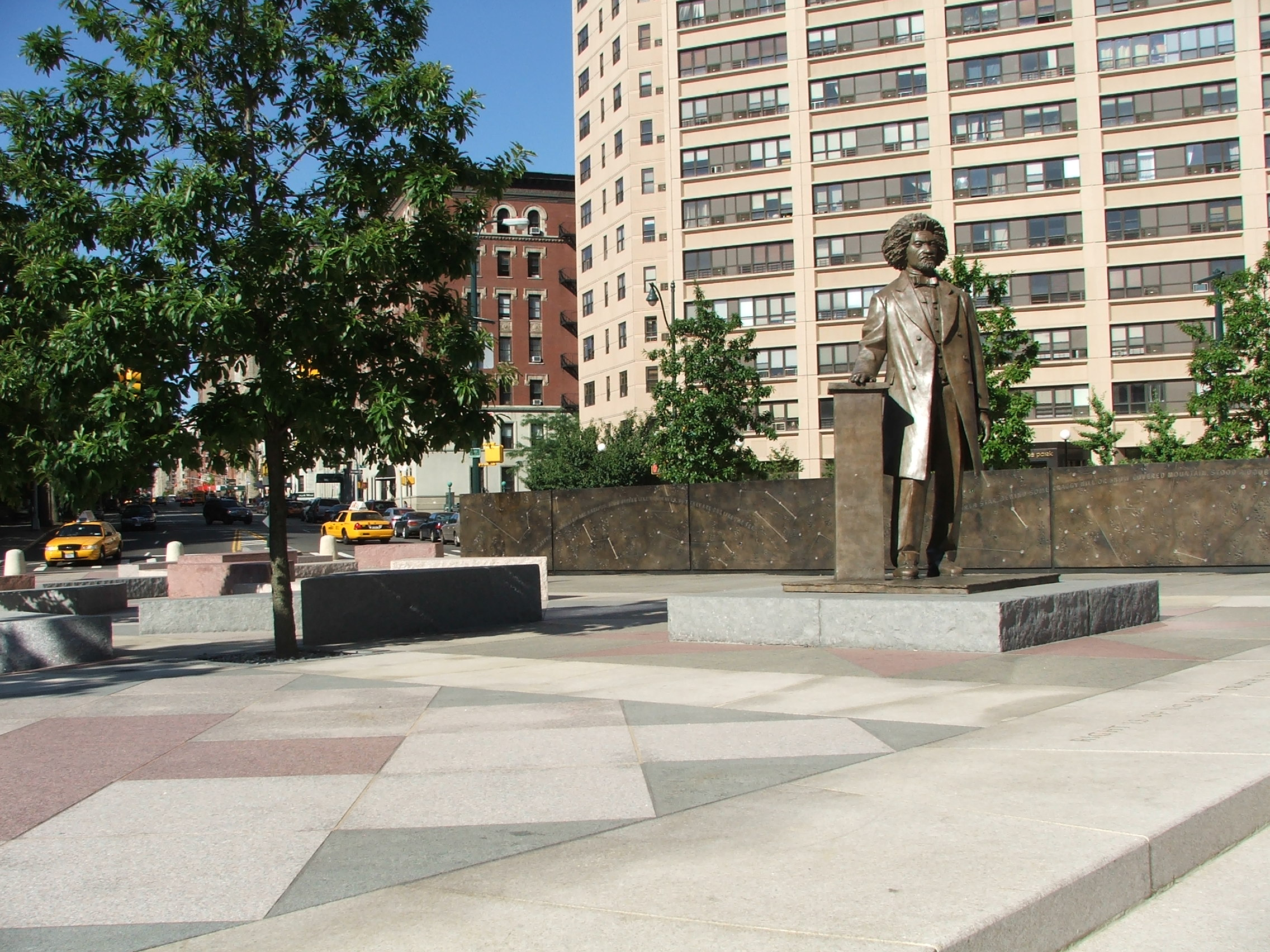
- The memorial in 2010
- Artist: Gabriel Koren (sculpture); Algernon Miller (fountain); Quennel Rothschild (landscape architect)
- Year: 2011
- Medium: Bronze sculpture
- Subject: Frederick Douglass
- Location: New York City, New York, U.S.; 40.800640°N 73.958141°W

The Frederick Douglass Memorial is a memorial commemorating Frederick Douglass, installed at the northwest corner of New York City's Central Park, in the U.S. state of New York. The memorial includes an 8-foot bronze sculpture depicting Douglass by Gabriel Koren and a large circle and fountain designed by Algernon Miller. Additionally, Quennell Rothschild & Partners is credited as the memorial's architecture, and Polich-Tallix served as the foundry. The memorial was dedicated on September 20, 2011, and was funded by the Percent for Art program and the, New York City Department of Cultural Affairs.

== See also ==
- 2011 in art
- Frederick Douglass Memorial Bridge
- Frederick Douglass National Historic Site
