= Bust of Victor Herbert =

Sculpture in Manhattan, New York, U.S.

Victor Herbert
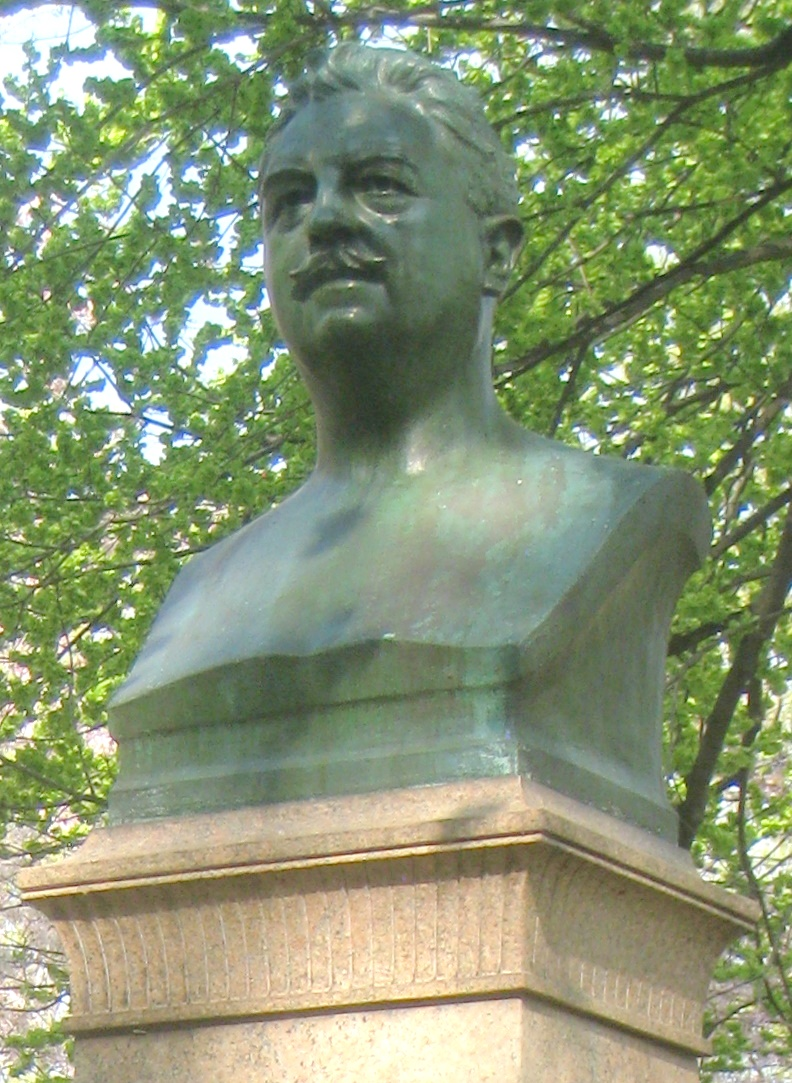
- The sculpture in 2010
- Artist: Edmund Thomas Quinn
- Year: 1927
- Type: Sculpture
- Medium: Bronze
- Subject: Victor Herbert
- Location: New York City, New York, United States; 40.7728°N 73.9720°W

Victor Herbert is an outdoor bronze portrait bust of Victor Herbert by Edmond Thomas Quinn, located in Central Park in Manhattan, New York.

== History ==
The memorial sculpture, commissioned by the American Society of Composers, Authors, and Publishers (ASCAP), was unveiled by Herbert's daughter in 1927 at a dedication attended by Irving Berlin and Arthur Hammerstein. It is located on the Central Park Mall, which has a history as a venue for a free concert series. Herbert is one of four musicians memorialized as sculptures in Central Park; the other musicians are John Lennon memorialized by Strawberry Fields, Beethoven, and Duke Ellington.
