= Equestrian statue of José de San Martín (Central Park) =

Equestrian statue in Central Park, Manhattan, New York, U.S.

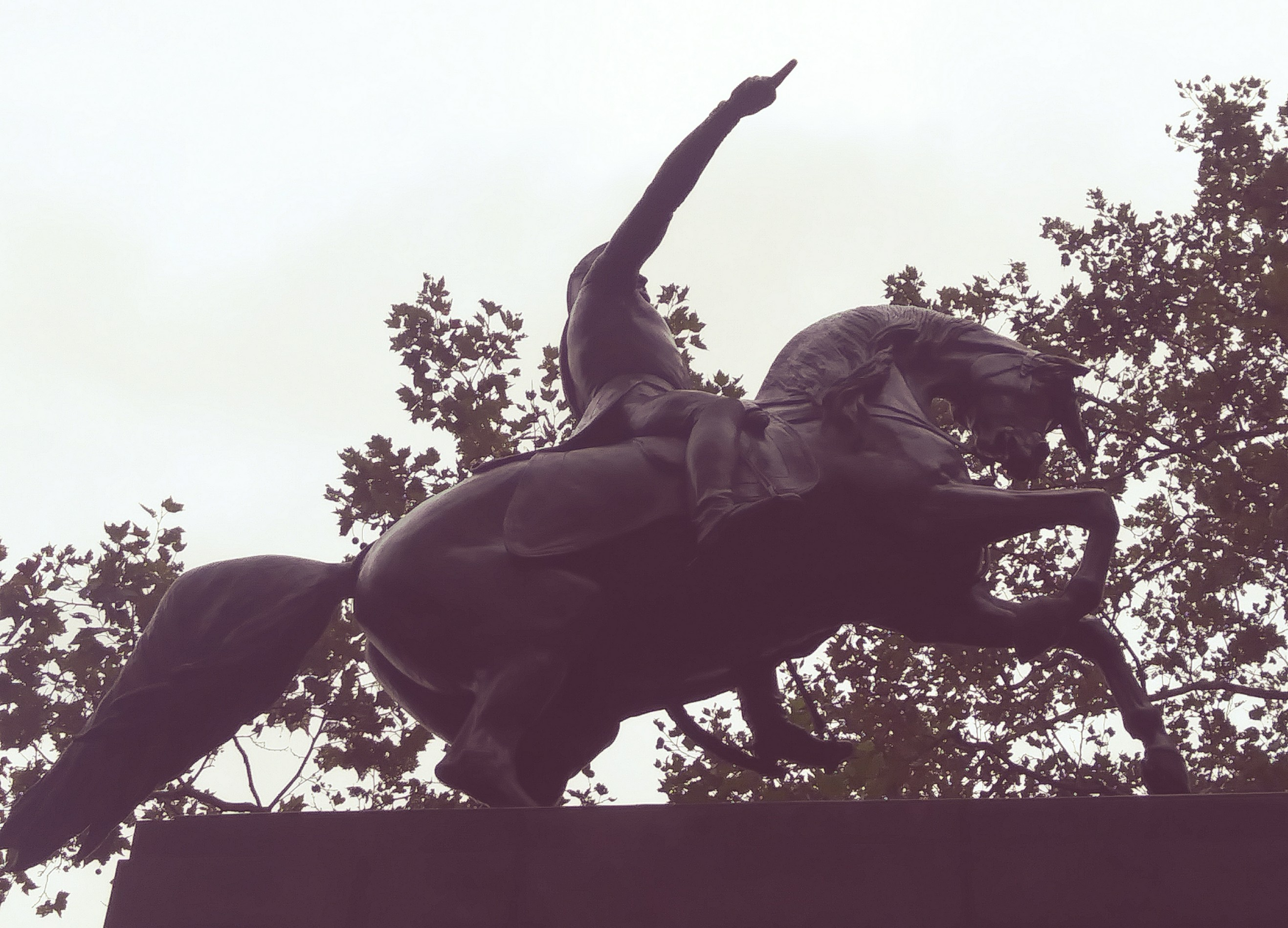
- The statue in 2019
- Artist: Louis-Joseph Daumas
- Medium: Bronze (figure and escutcheon); Granite (pedestal)
- Subject: José de San Martín
- Location: New York City, New York, U.S.; 40°45′57.8″N 73°58′35.8″W

An equestrian statue of José de San Martín by Louis-Joseph Daumas is installed in Manhattan's Central Park, in the U.S. state of New York. The sculpture was cast c. 1950 and dedicated on May 25, 1951.
