= Eagles and Prey =

Sculpture in Manhattan, New York, U.S.

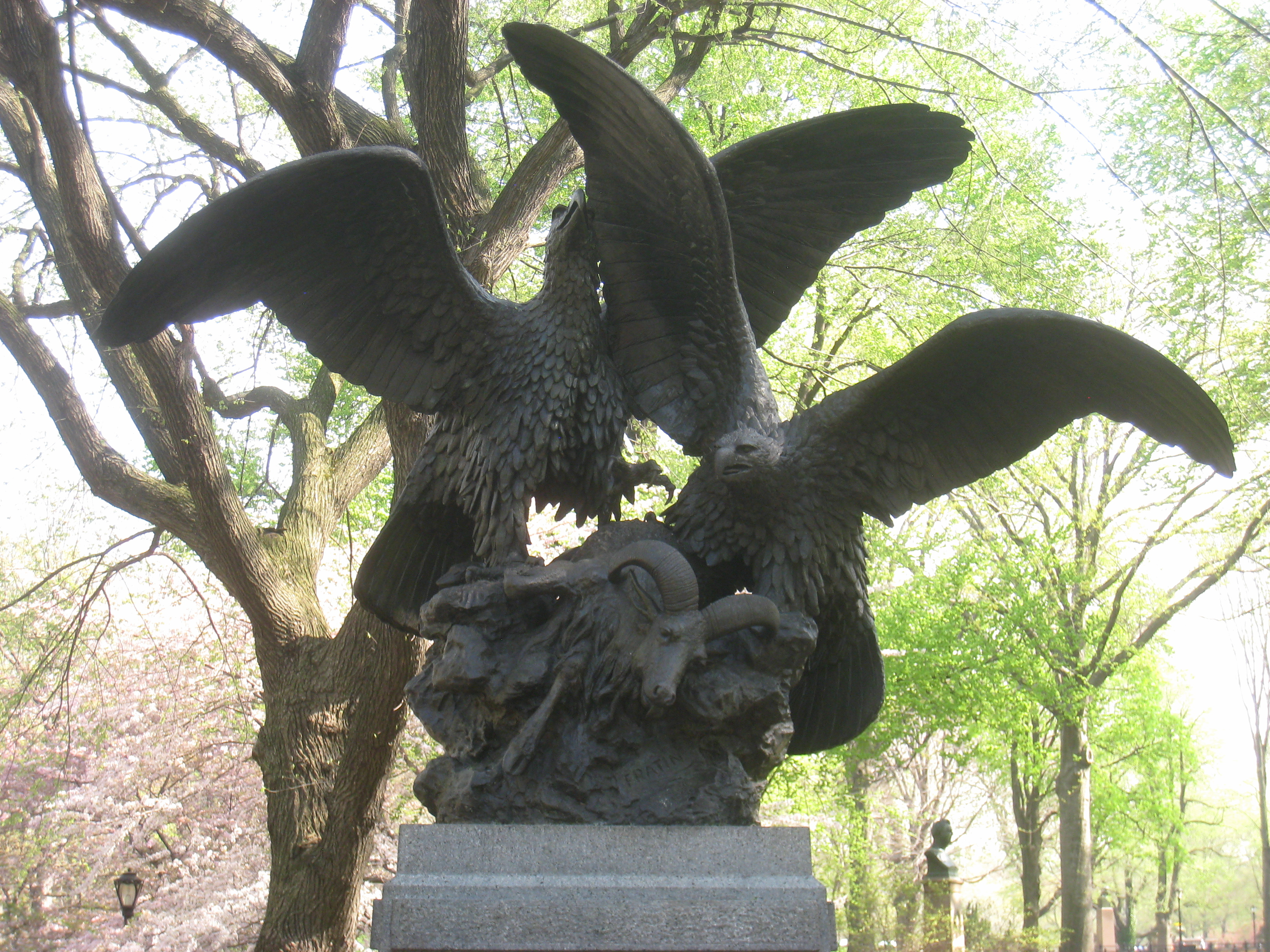
- The sculpture in 2010
- Artist: Christophe Fratin
- Year: 1850
- Type: Sculpture
- Medium: Bronze
- Subject: Liberty of America
- Location: New York City, New York, United States; 40.77167°N 73.97308°W

Eagles and Prey is an outdoor bronze sculpture by Christophe Fratin, located in Central Park in Manhattan, New York. Created in 1850 and installed in Central Park in 1863, it is the earliest known sculpture to be installed in any New York City park.
