= Equestrian statue of Simón Bolívar (Central Park) =

Equestrian statue in Central Park, Manhattan, New York, U.S.

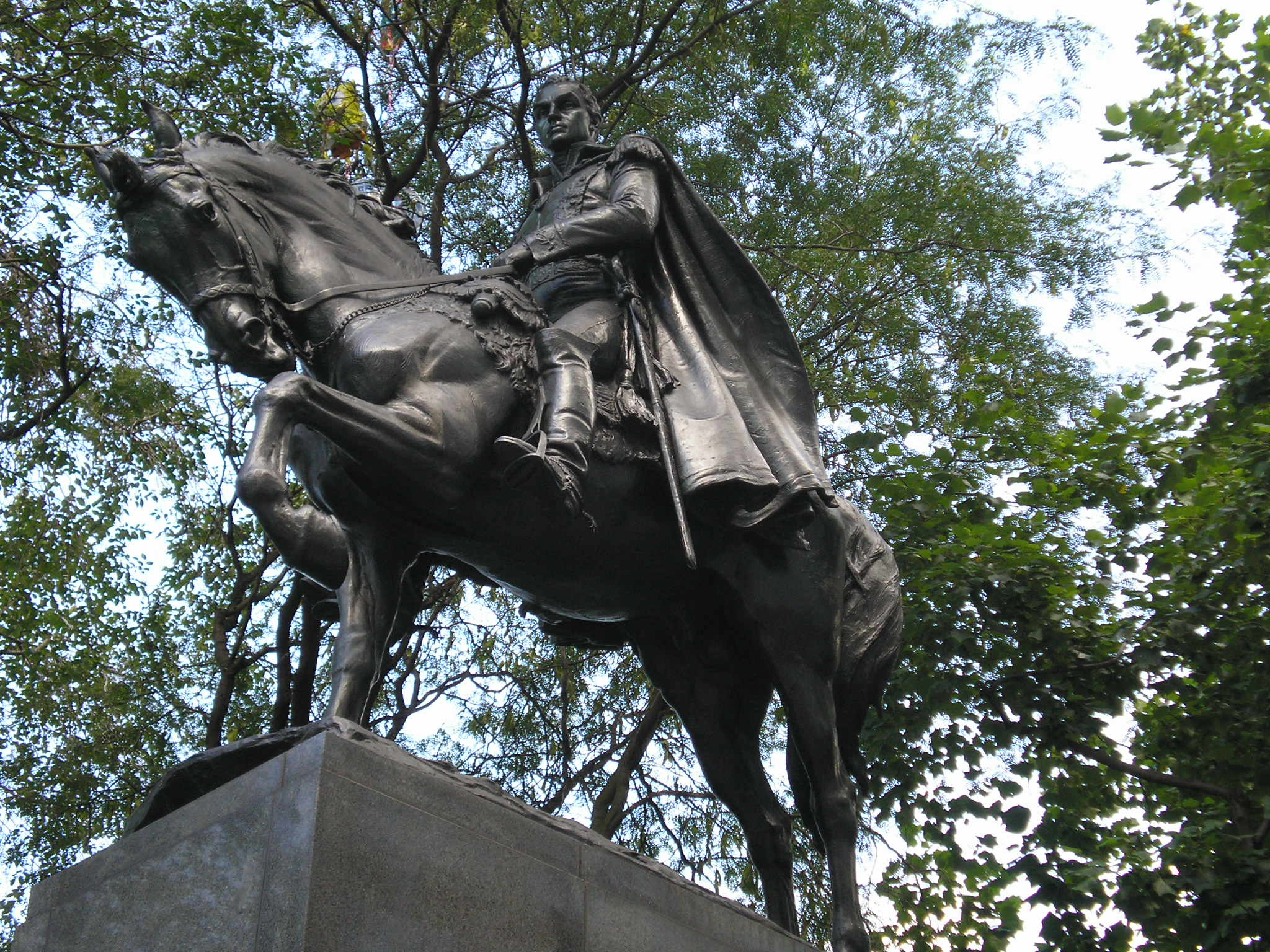
- The statue in 2006
- Artist: Sally James Farnham
- Medium: Bronze; granite
- Subject: Simón Bolívar
- Location: New York City, New York, U.S.; 40°45′56.4″N 73°58′32.8″W

An equestrian statue of Simón Bolívar, sometimes called the Simón Bolívar Monument, is installed in Manhattan's Central Park, in the U.S. state of New York. The memorial features a bronze sculpture by Sally James Farnham resting on a black granite pedestal designed by the firm Clarke and Rapuano. It was cast in 1919, dedicated on April 19, 1921, rededicated on April 19, 1951, and conserved by the Adopt-a-Monument Program in 1988.

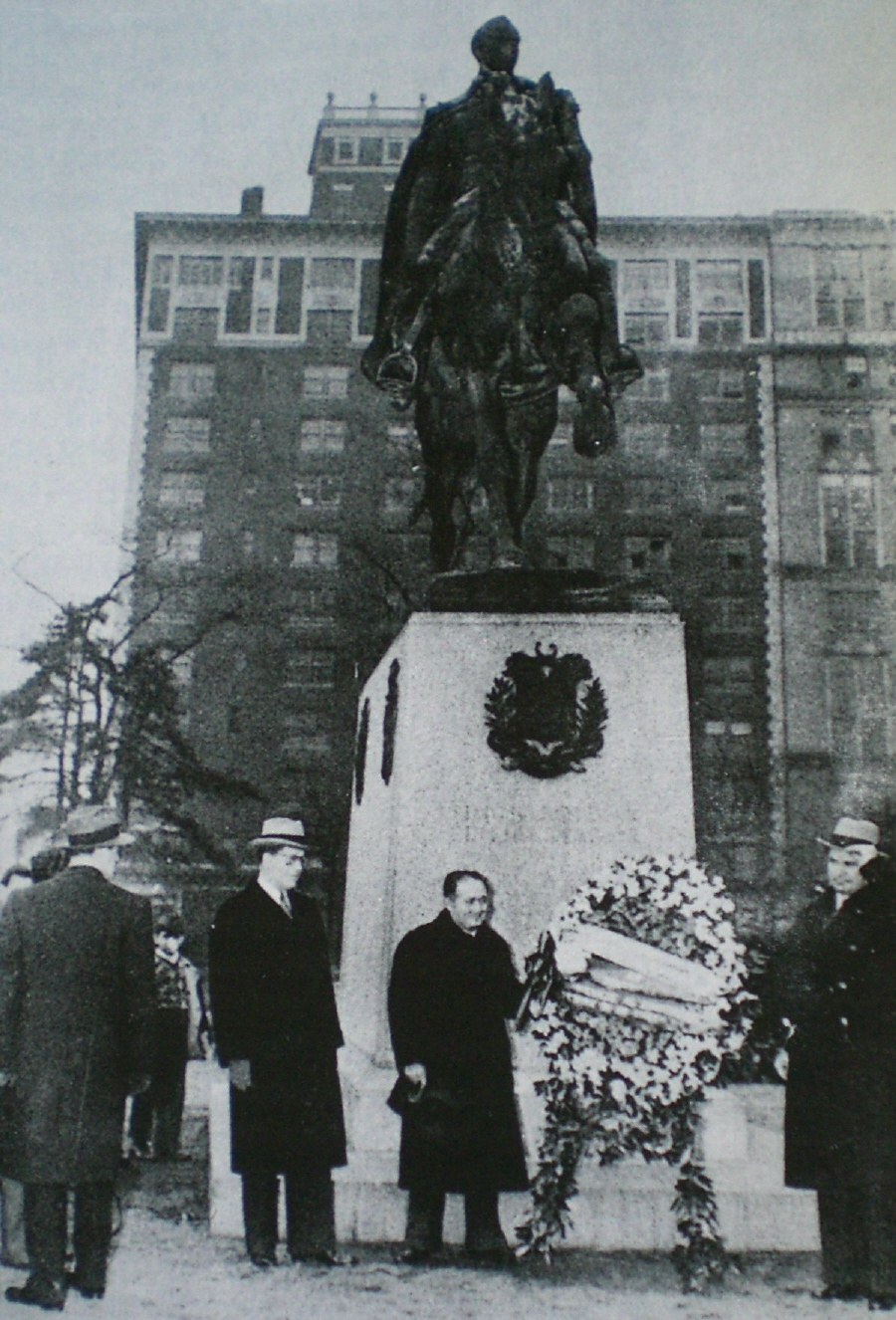

The sculpture at its
original location.

== See also ==
- 1919 in art
