= Seventh Regiment Memorial =

Memorial and sculpture in Manhattan, New York, U.S.

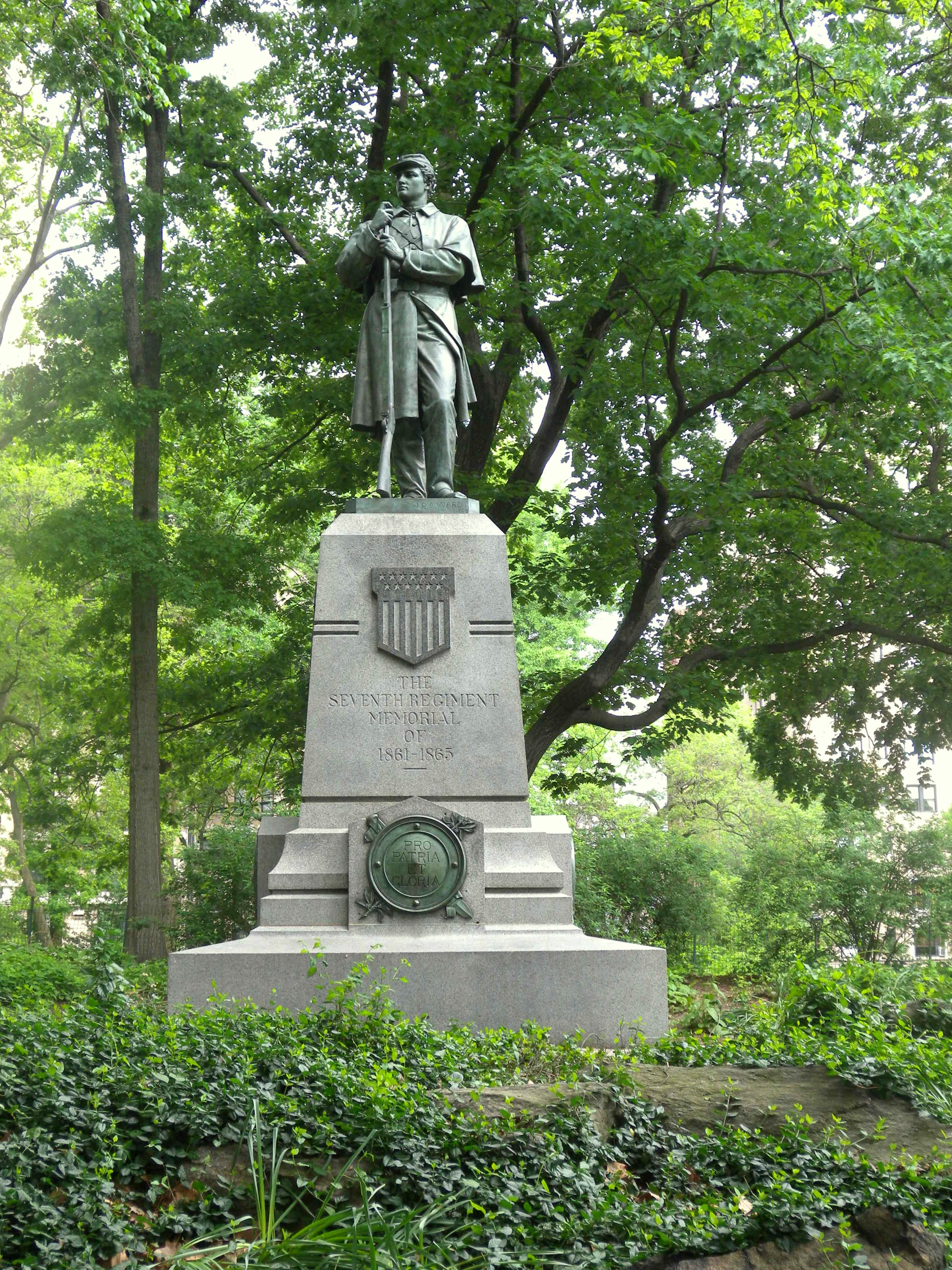
- The monument in 2011
- Artist: John Quincy Adams Ward
- Year: 1869
- Type: Sculpture
- Medium: Bronze
- Location: New York City, New York, United States; 40.77377°N 73.97640°W

Seventh Regiment Memorial is an outdoor bronze sculpture atop a granite base honoring those members of the regiment who died during the Civil War. The sculptor John Quincy Adams Ward created the statue and the architect Richard Morris Hunt designed the base. Although the statue is dated 1869 the monument was not unveiled until June 22, 1874.

== Description and history ==
Ward likely received the commission in 1867, with funds to be provided by the Seventh Regiment Monument Association. He finished a model by the spring of 1868. Initially, Hunt designed a much larger monument, one with at least five figures, part of his elaborate scheme for the "Warrior Gate" entrance to Central Park. However the park's architects, Olmsted to and Vaux, had already clashed with Hunt over matters of aesthetics with the result that Hunt's grand scheme of a series of showy Beaux-Arts entrances to the park was reduced to the Seventh Regiment Memorial.

The art historian E. Wayne Craven considers the work "a failure", even though it is a work of art, stating,"neither the 'Shakespeare' nor the 'Seventh Regiment Soldier' were portrait statues in the usual sense, and therein lies the explanation for their failures. Ward often lacked the vision to create a successful imaginary portrait, and his images of men who could actually stand before him were, as a rule, much stronger as works of art." The soldier in the monument was modeled by actor, and veteran of the Regiment Steele MacKaye, who wore his own uniform to pose in.
