= Samuel Finley Breese Morse (sculpture) =

Statue by Byron M. Pickett in Manhattan, New York, U.S.

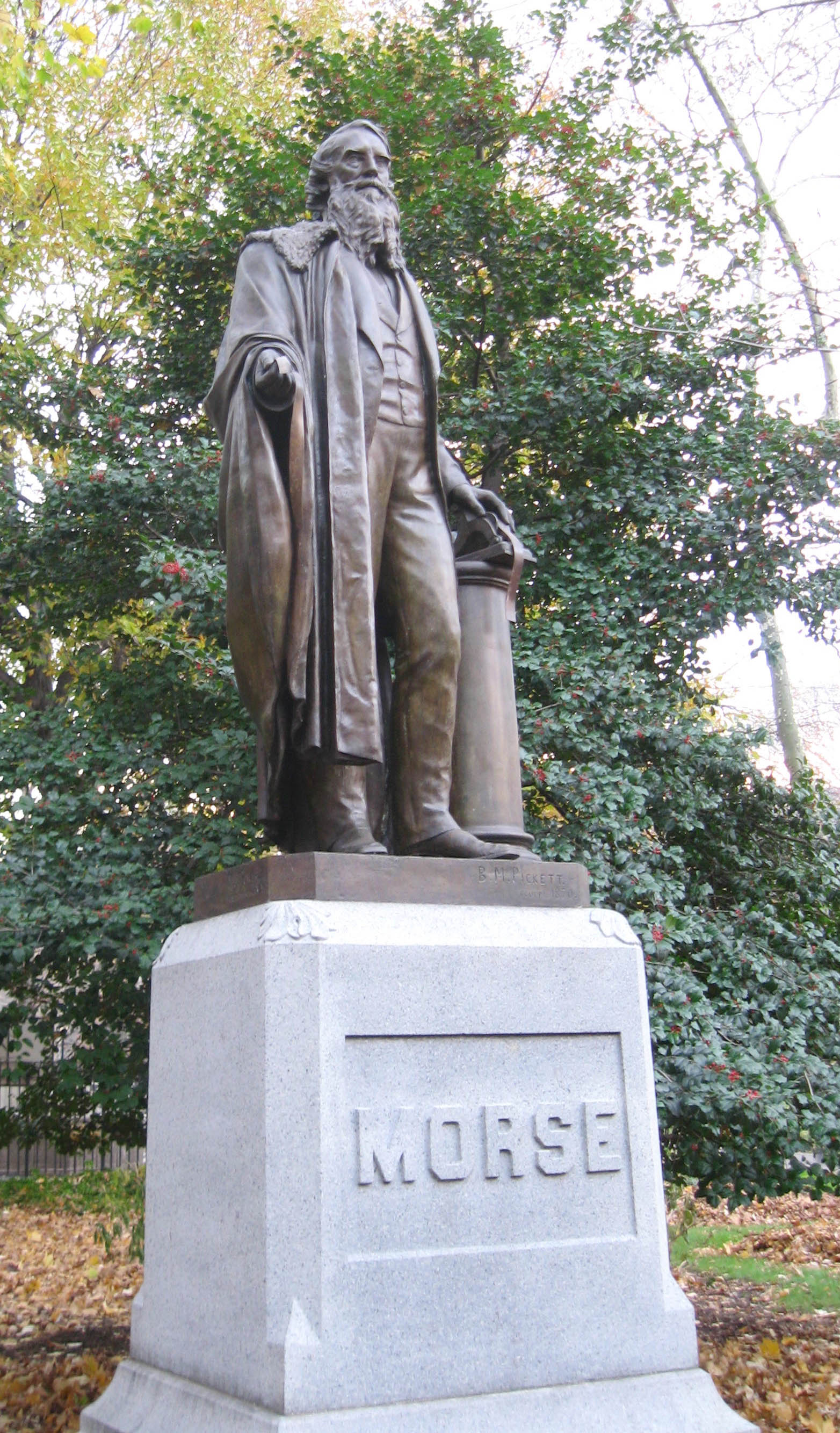
- The sculpture in 2008
- Year: 1871
- Type: Sculpture
- Medium: Bronze
- Subject: Samuel Morse
- Location: New York City, New York, United States; 40.7725°N 73.967306°W

Samuel Finley Breese Morse is an outdoor bronze sculpture depicting American painter and inventor Samuel Morse by Byron M. Pickett, located in Central Park in Manhattan, New York. The portrait statue measures 13' x 5'6" x 5' and sits on a Quincy granite pedestal. It was dedicated on June 10, 1871.
