= Statue of Walter Scott (New York City) =

Statue in Manhattan, New York, U.S.

Sir Walter Scott
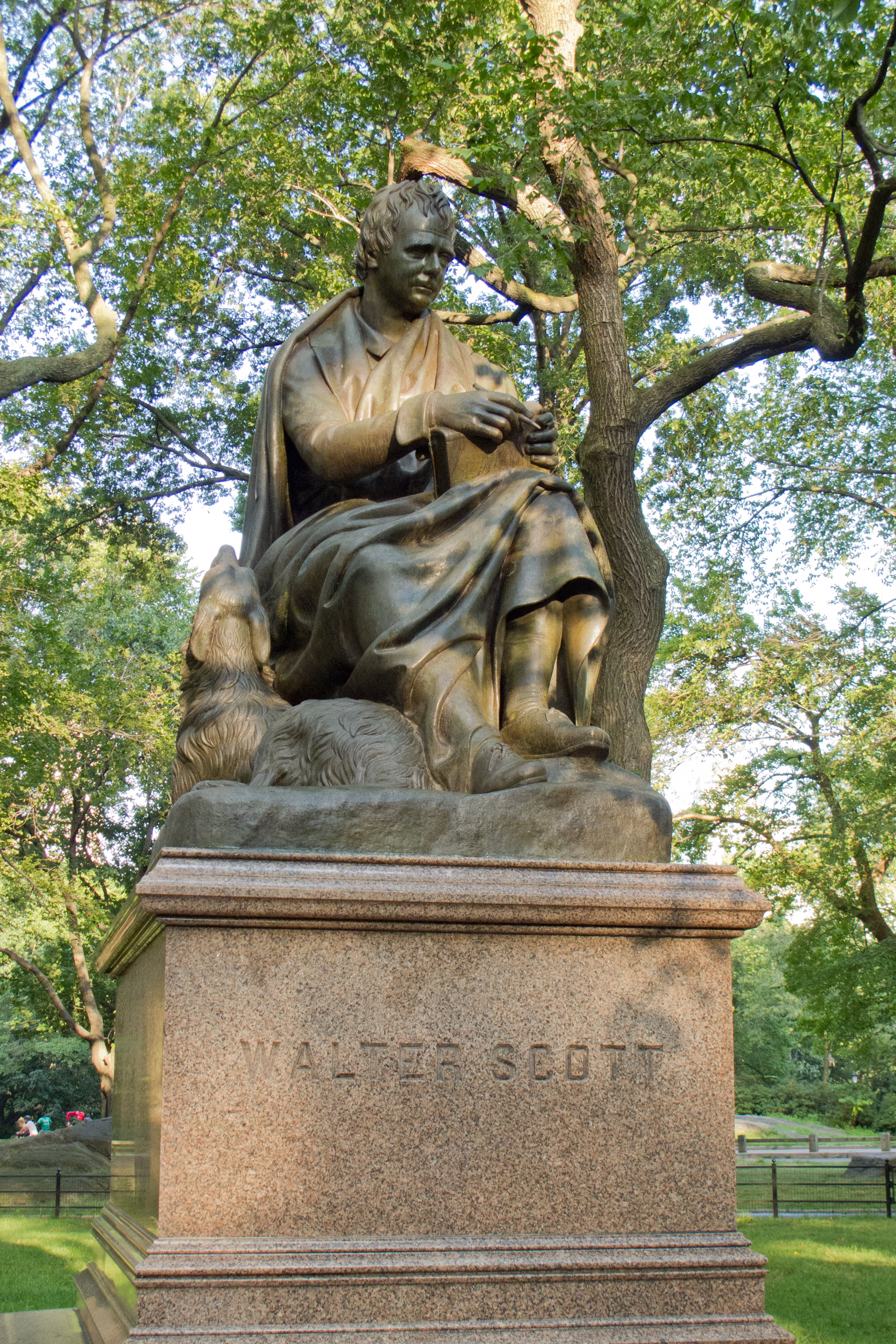
- The sculpture in 2012
- Artist: John Steell
- Year: 1871
- Type: Sculpture
- Medium: Bronze
- Subject: Walter Scott
- Location: New York City, New York, United States; 40.77015°N 73.97230°W

Sir Walter Scott is an outdoor bronze portrait statue of Walter Scott and the writer's favorite dog Maida by John Steell, located in Central Park in Manhattan, New York. The memorial sculpture, a replica of the 1845 original in Edinburgh's Scott Monument, was cast in 1871 and dedicated on November 27, 1872. It was donated by resident Scottish-Americans.
