= Carmel Berkson =

American sculptor (born 1924)

- Born: November 8, 1924 (age 101); New York City, U.S.
- Occupation: Sculptor
- Awards: Padma Shri (2010)

Carmel Berkson (born November 8, 1924) is an American sculptor known for her documentation and books on Indian art, aesthetics and architecture. She was conferred the Padma Shri by the Government of India in 2010.

== Early life and education ==
Berkson was born in New York City on November 8, 1924. She majored in history at the Duke University and after graduation, studied sculpture at the Columbia University under Milton Hebald. She is married to Martin Fleisher a batchmate of hers from Duke.

== Work in India ==
By the time she first visited India in 1970 Berkson had been a practising sculptor for 22 years. That trip, during which she visited Elephanta, Ellora and Mahabalipuram, was a transformative one for her. Berkson soon gave up her career as a sculptor and began to tour India to study its important architectural and cultural sites. In 1977 she moved her main residence to Mumbai in India to continue with her research into the philosophy, mythology and artistic developments in Indian sculpture.

== Notable works ==
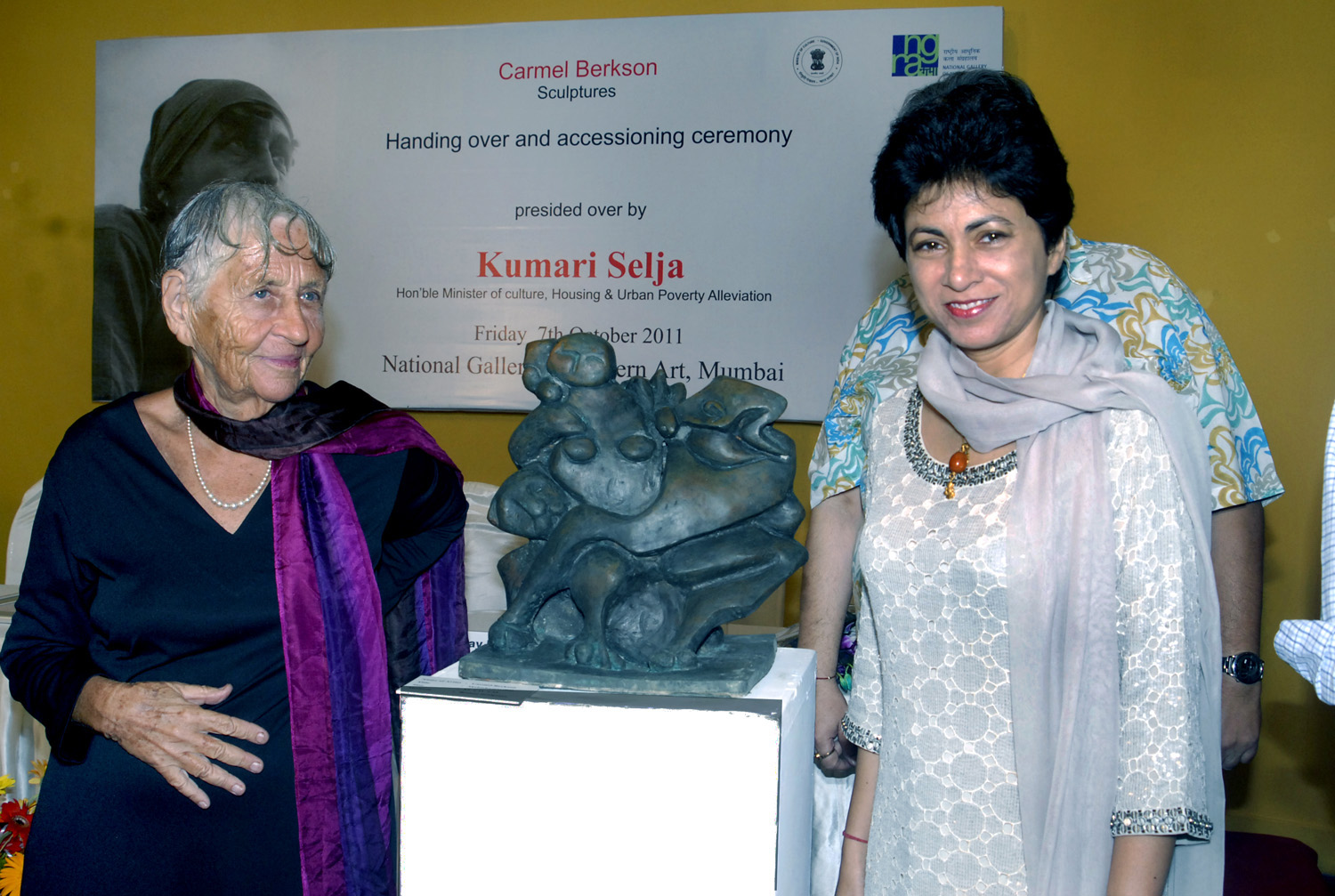
Carmel Berkson with India's Minister for Culture, Kumari Selja in 2011

=== Sculpture ===
Berkson is noted for both her documentation and commentary on Indian art as well as her own work as a sculptor. She took up sculpting again in 2001 after a hiatus of nearly three decades. Most of her sculptures are renditions of figures from Indian mythology but reflect cubist influences in their depiction.

Her work while drawing from and alluding to Hindu, Christian and Buddhist mythology are noted for their simple, clean forms that reflect a modern aesthetic.

Some of her sculptures are those of Lakshmi and Vishnu as horse and mare, bronze statues of Shiva as Apsamara and of Vishnu atop Garuda. The Metropolitan Museum of Art, New York has in its possession a collection of her photographs of ancient Indian sculpture.

=== Books ===
Berkson is the author of several books on Indian art. These include:

- Elephanta, the cave of Shiva
- The caves at Aurangabad: early Buddhist tantric art in India
- The divine and demoniac: Mahisa's heroic struggle with Durga
- Ellora, concept and style
- The life of form in Indian sculpture
- Indian sculpture : towards the rebirth of aesthetics.

== Awards and honours ==
The Government of India honoured Berkson by awarding her the Padma Shri in 2010. Berkson announced her retirement from work and plans to return to the USA later that year. She donated 38 of her sculptures to the permanent collection at the National Gallery of Modern Art, Mumbai in 2011.
