= Romeo and Juliet (Hebald) =

Sculpture by Milton Hebald in Manhattan, New York, U.S.

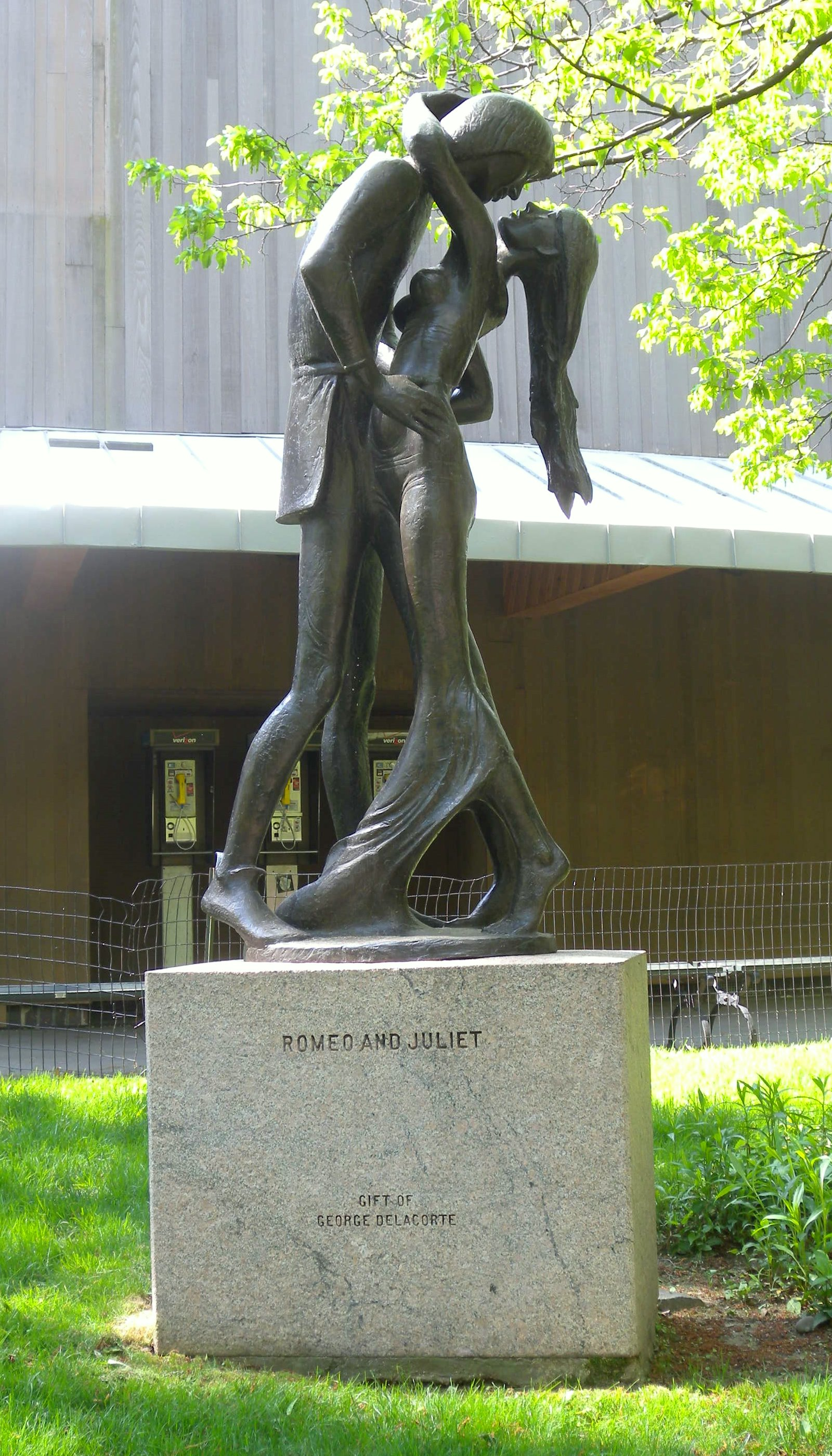
- The sculpture in 2011
- Artist: Milton Hebald
- Year: 1978
- Type: Sculpture
- Medium: Bronze; granite
- Subject: Romeo and Juliet
- Dimensions: 2.1 m (7 ft)
- Location: New York City, New York; Los Angeles, California; 40.78014°N 73.96879°W

Romeo and Juliet is an outdoor bronze sculpture depicting Romeo and Juliet by American artist Milton Hebald, located in front of Delacorte Theater in Manhattan's Central Park, in the United States. It is one of two companion works at the theater sculpted by Hebald, the other being The Tempest (1966). Unveiled in 1977 and cast in 1978, Romeo and Juliet was donated by philanthropist George T. Delacorte, Jr. The sculpture is 7 feet (2.1 m) tall; the two figures, shown embracing, are set on a granite pedestal. A cast from the same mold appears in the rose garden at the Hollenbeck Palms retirement community in Boyle Heights, Los Angeles.

== See also ==
- 1978 in art
