= Margo Hebald-Heymann =

American architect

Margo Hebald Heymann
- Education: Cornell University College of Architecture, Art, and Planning.
- Occupation: Architect

Margo Hebald (Heymann) was an American architect. Formally based in Santa Monica, California, she specialized in commercial work, transportation, and healthcare facilities.

== Life and education ==
She was the daughter of the sculptor Milton Hebald. She graduated Cornell University College of Architecture, Art, and Planning and attended the Universitá d'Architetura, Sapienza, Rome, Italy. She was one of five women in the freshman class of 64 students, in the class of 1963.

== Work ==
She was associate architect for Terminal One at LAX Los Angeles International Airport. She was architect and interior designer for children's dental clinics in Oxnard, Camarillo and Simi Valley in California (published). She was design consultant architect with the Luckman Partnerships in the plans for the metro rail station in Universal City, California.

== Notable projects ==
- Terminal One, Los Angeles International Airport, Los Angeles, California
- Union Station/Metro Rail, Los Angeles, California. Consultant to Harry Weese.
- Simi Valley Hospital, Simi Valley, California
- Northridge Hospital Medical Center and Gift Shop and chapel, Northridge, California
- University of California-Los Angeles Medical Center, Los Angeles, California (Head Neck Clinic;Marion Davies Pediatric Clinic; Orthopedic Center; Ninth and Tenth Floors)
- Community Hospital of Sacramento, Sacramento, California
- S.E. Rykoff Offices, Los Angeles, California
- Suite for Doctors Doberne and Brooks, Simi Valley, California
- Universal City Metro Rail Station, Los Angeles, California
- Cantor Dental Suite, Simi Valley, California
- Lisagor Dental Suite, Camarillo, California
- Marion Davies Children's Clinic, University of California-Los Angeles, Los Angeles, California
- Oxnard Children's Dental Group, Oxnard, California
- Westlake Plaza Medical Building, Thousand Oaks, California
- Santa Monica Mall Building, Santa Monica, California
- Bellflower City Hospital, Bellflower, California
- Olive View Medical Center, Sylmar, California
- Suite for Doctors Nathanson and Turnier, Northridge, California
- Veterans Administration Hospital, Brentwood, California
- Orthopedic Surgery Medical Group, Los Angeles, California
- Bank of America California State, Los Angeles, California
