= The Tempest (Hebald) =

Bronze sculpture in Central Park, Manhattan, New York, U.S.

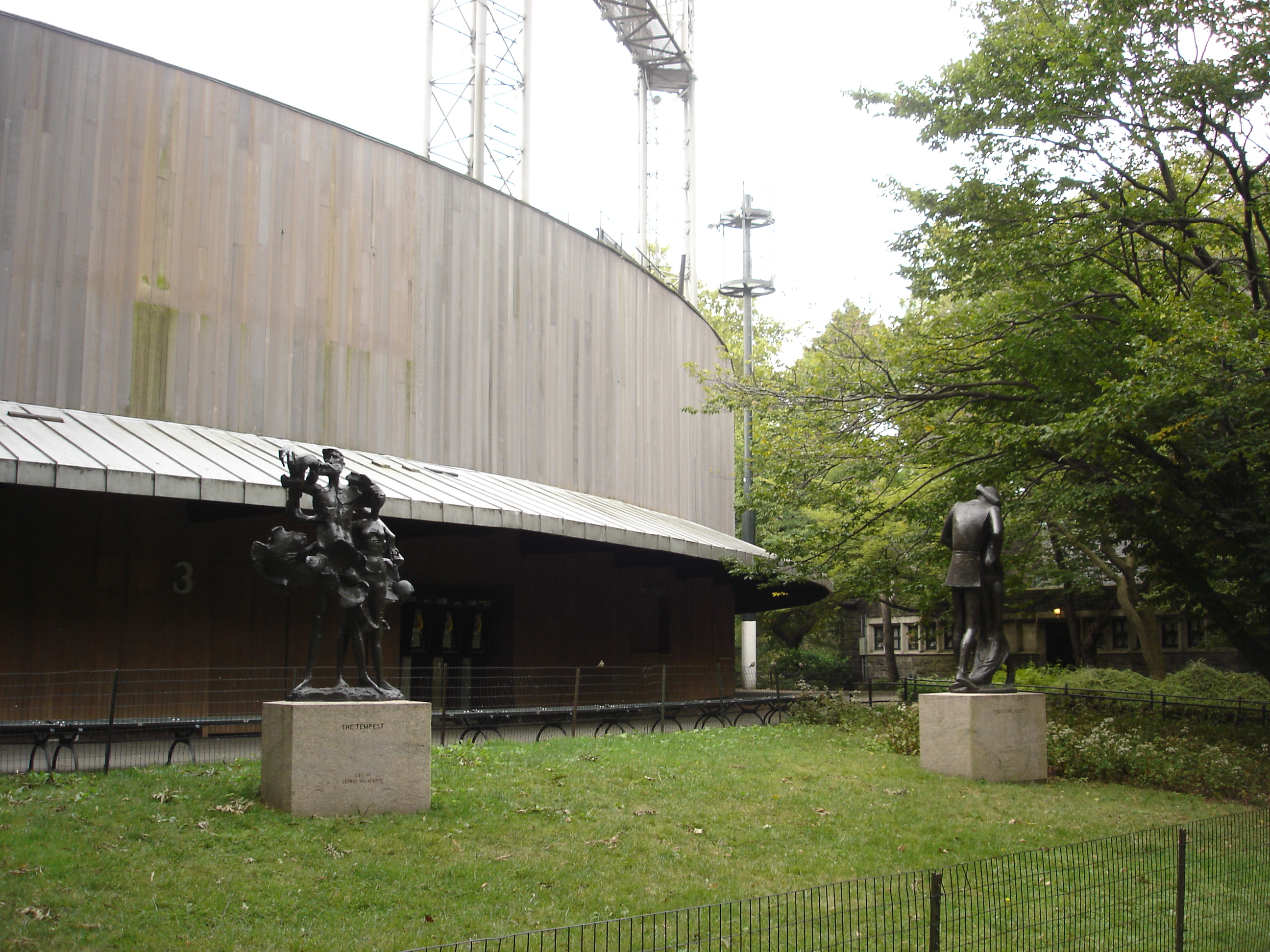
- The Tempest (on left), 2009
- Artist: Milton Hebald
- Year: 1966
- Type: Sculpture
- Medium: Bronze
- Subject: Prospero and Miranda
- Location: New York City, New York; 40.78014°N 73.96879°W

The Tempest, also known as The Tempest (Prospero and Miranda), or simply Prospero and Miranda, is an outdoor bronze sculpture depicting Prospero and Miranda from William Shakespeare's The Tempest by Milton Hebald, installed outside Delacorte Theater in Manhattan's Central Park, in the U.S. state of New York. The work, which was donated by George T. Delacorte, Jr. and unveiled in 1966, is a companion piece to Romeo and Juliet (1977).

== See also ==
- 1966 in art
