= Aurangabad Caves =

Rock-cut Buddhist shrine in Maharashtra, India

Coordinates: 19°55′01″N 75°18′43″E

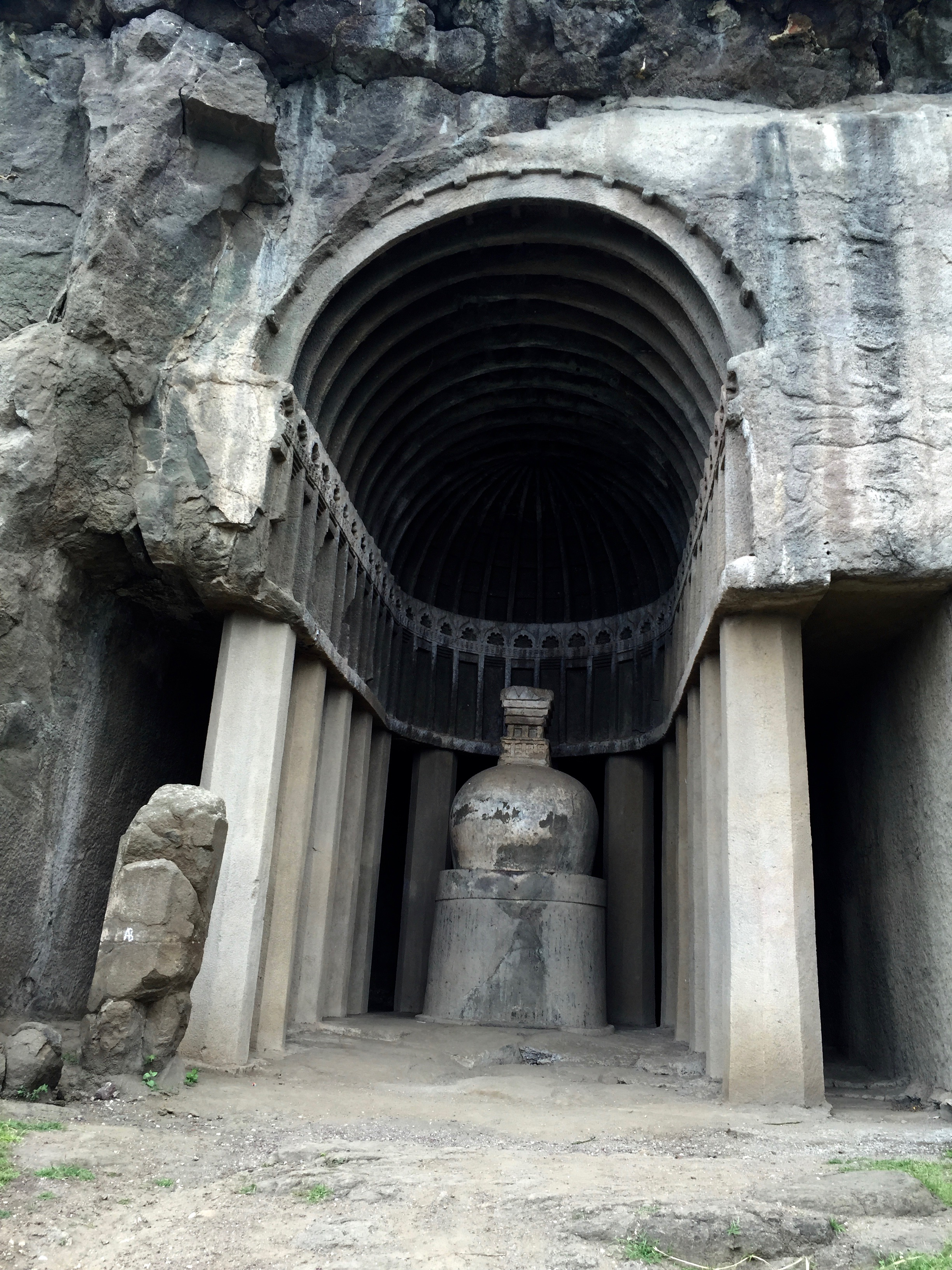
Chaitya with stupa, Cave IV (4), Aurangabad Caves

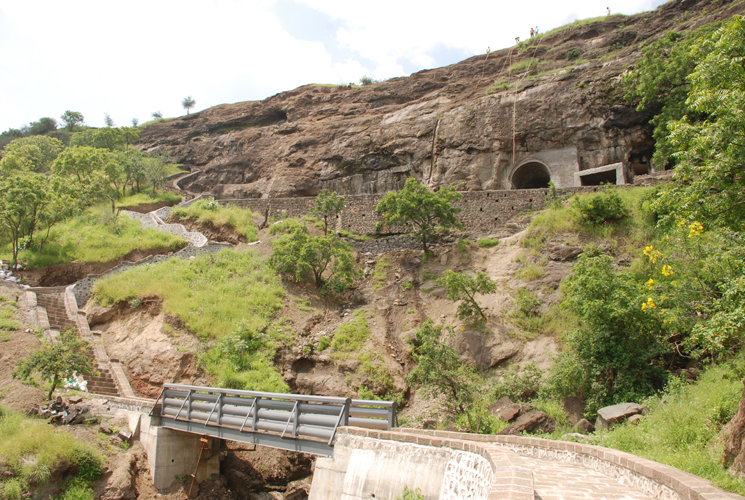
Aurangabad Caves, from a distance

The Aurangabad caves now known as Chhatrapati Sambhajinagar Caves are a series of twelve rock-cut Buddhist shrines located on a hill running roughly east to west, close to the city of Aurangabad in northern Maharashtra. The first reference to the Aurangabad Caves is in the great chaitya of Kanheri Caves. The caves were dug out of comparatively soft basalt rock during the 6th and 7th century.

The caves are divided into three separate groups depending on their location: these are usually called the "Western Group", with Caves I to V (1 to 5), the "Eastern Group", with Caves VI to IX (6 to 9), and a "Northern Cluster", with the unfinished Caves X to XII (9 to 12).

The carvings within the Aurangabad caves are notable for including Hinayana style stupa, Mahayana art work and Vajrayana goddess. These caves are among those in India that show 1st millennium CE Buddhist artwork with goddesses such as Durga, and gods such as Ganesha, although Buddhist caves in other parts of India with these arts are older. Numerous Buddhist deities of the Tantra tradition are also carved in these caves.

== Introduction ==
The cave temples of Aurangabad carved between the 6th and the 8th century are nine kilometers from Aurangabad city center, a few kilometers from the campus of Dr Babasaheb Ambedkar Marathwada University, Soneri Mahal and the Bibi-ka-Maqbara.

Carved in the Sihaychal ranges, the Aurangabad caves somewhat have been overshadowed by the UNESCO World Heritage monuments of Ellora and Ajanta cave temples. Though its sculptures are comparable to Ajanta and Ellora, the caves are much smaller, more decrepit and less visited. Though in the 20th century, a few scholars started looking at these cave temples as a missing link between Ajanta and Ellora and also after an exhaustive study, were compelled to describe it as a " Sensitive remaking of life situated in time and space span". It is a protected monument under the Archaeological Survey of India.

== Caves I and III ==
"Caves I and III of Aurangabad and last caves of Ajanta co-existed as is apparent from striking parallels which we come across while examining both the sites. Again at Aurangabad after a careful study of both caves I and III, the conclusion the Historians have come to is that cave III was earlier to cave I. In Cave III the artist seems to have decorated with surprisingly neat and organized designs of fretwork, scrolls, panel of couples, tassels, flowers, geometrical designs, and highest point of perfection and consummation."

== Gallery ==
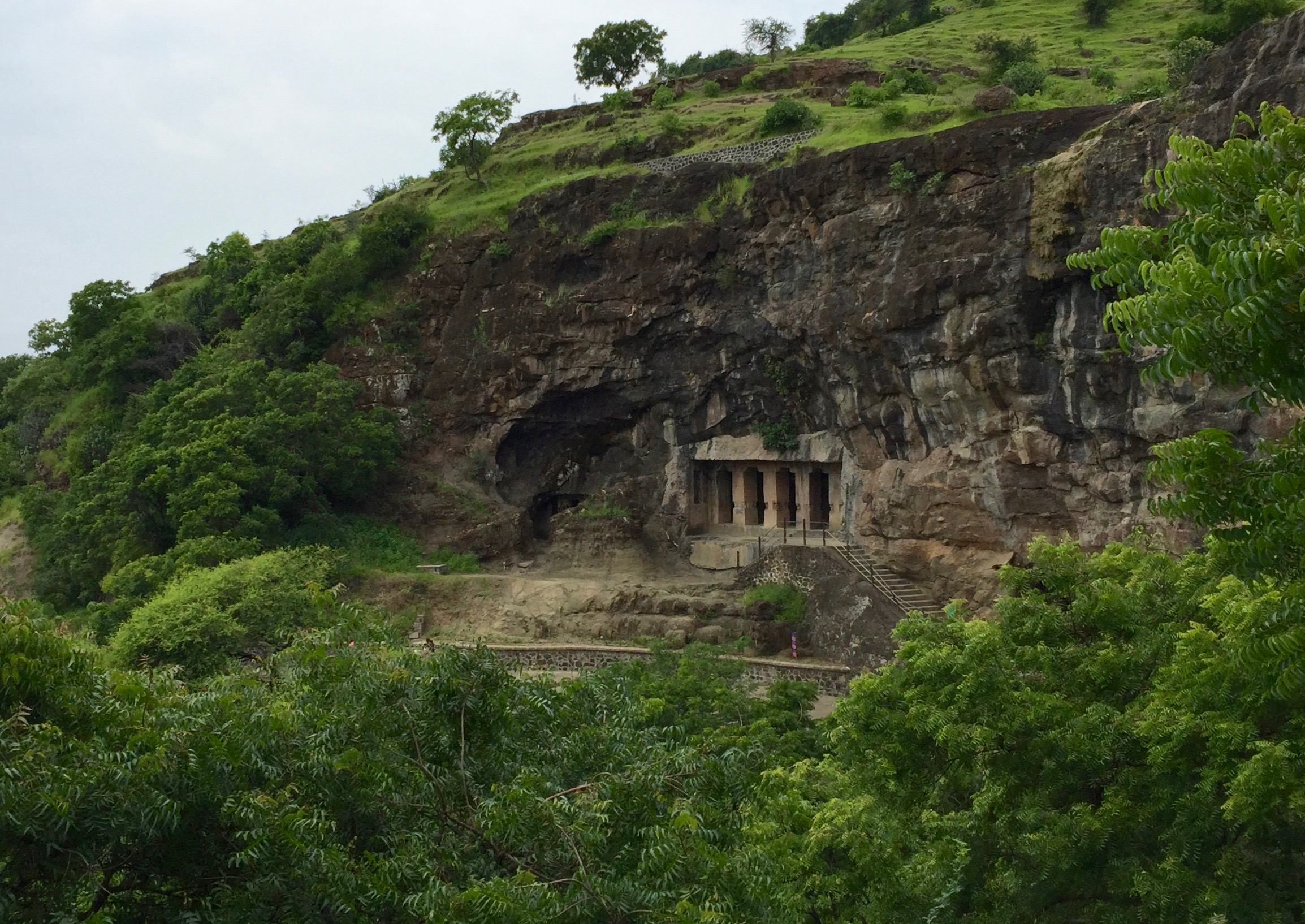
Aurangabad caves from distance

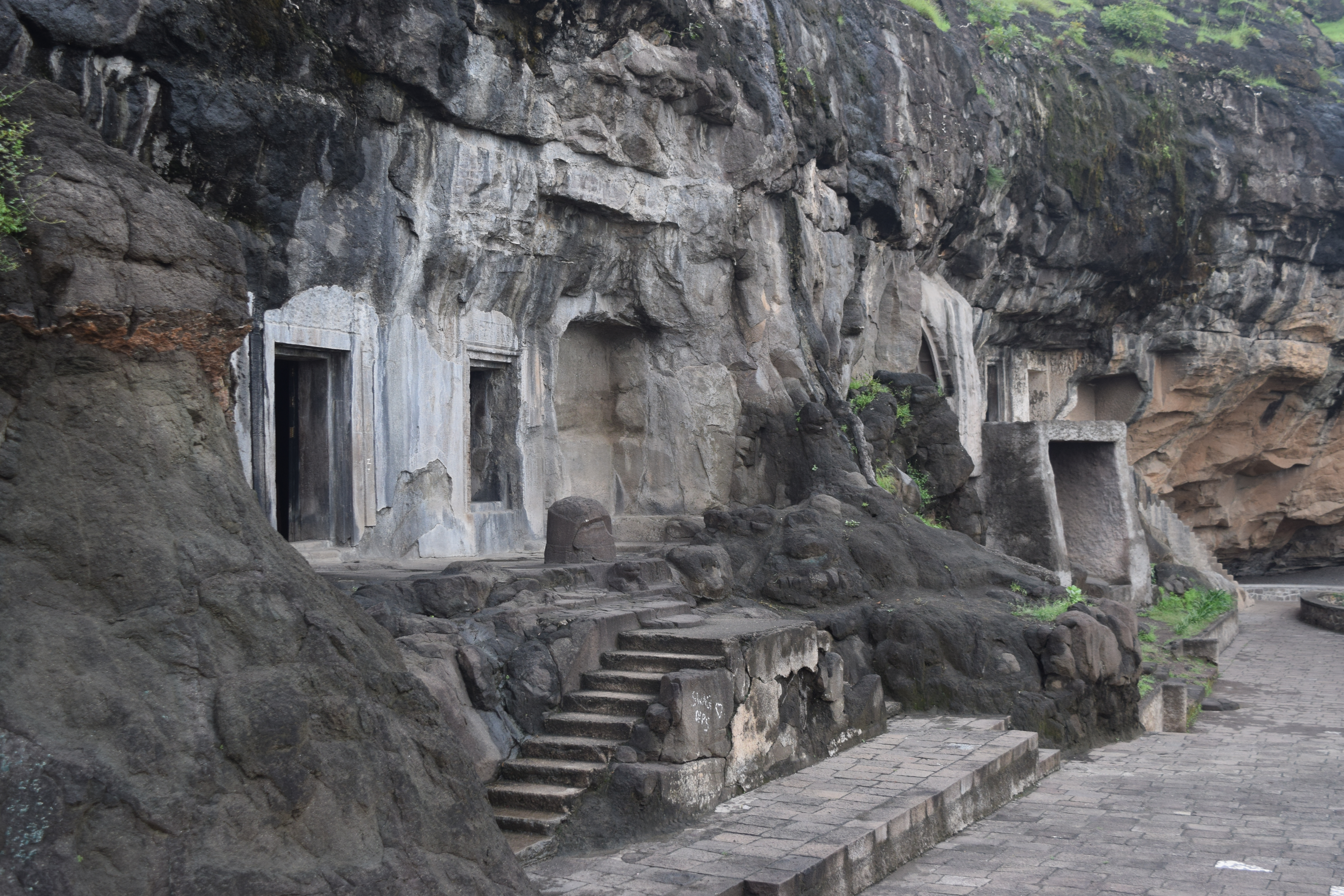
Stone stairs leading to an entrance

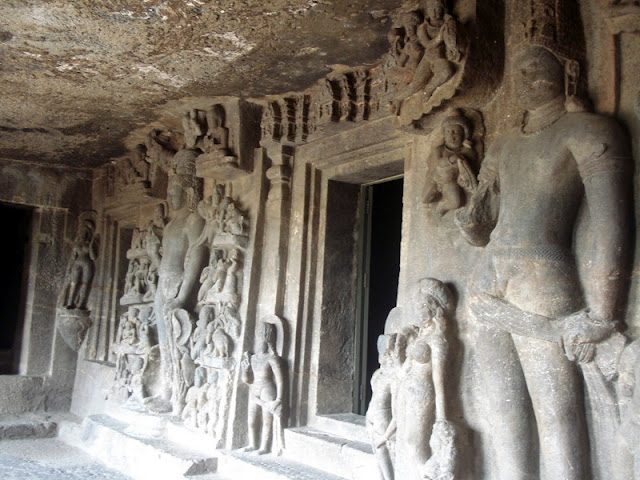
Various sculptures next to an entrance

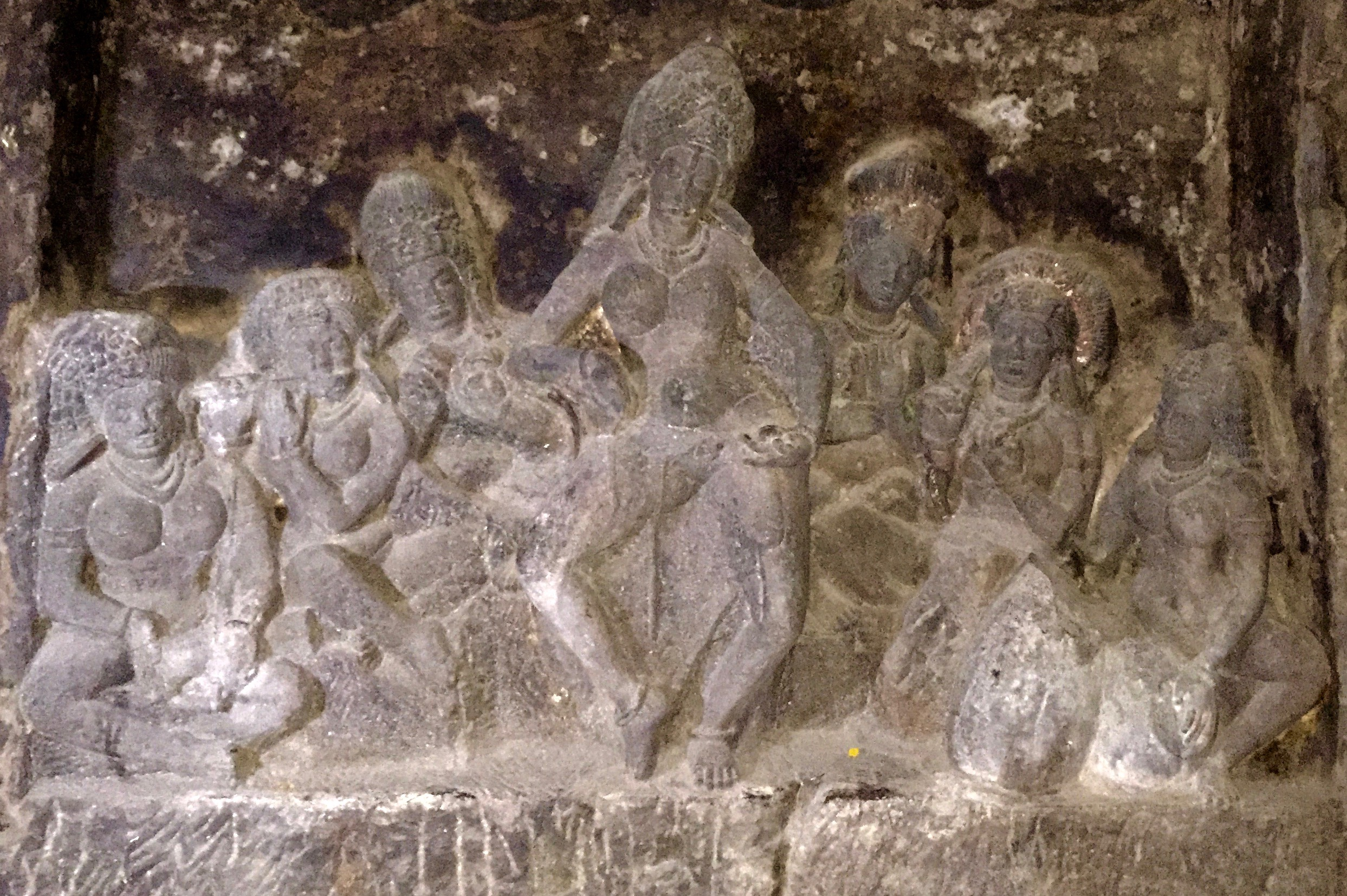
Dancing goddess

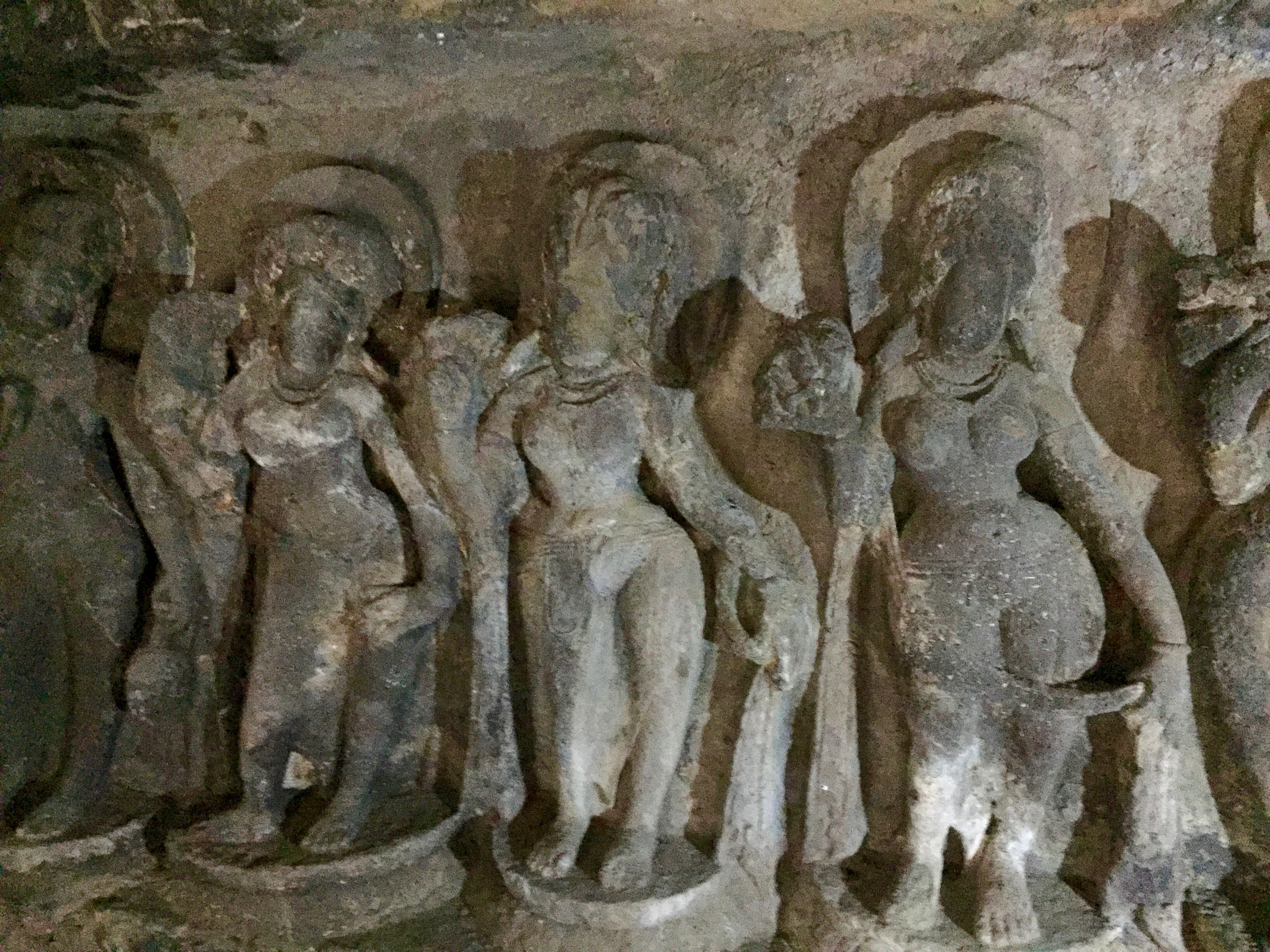
Mother goddesses (Matrikas) of Vajrayana Buddhism

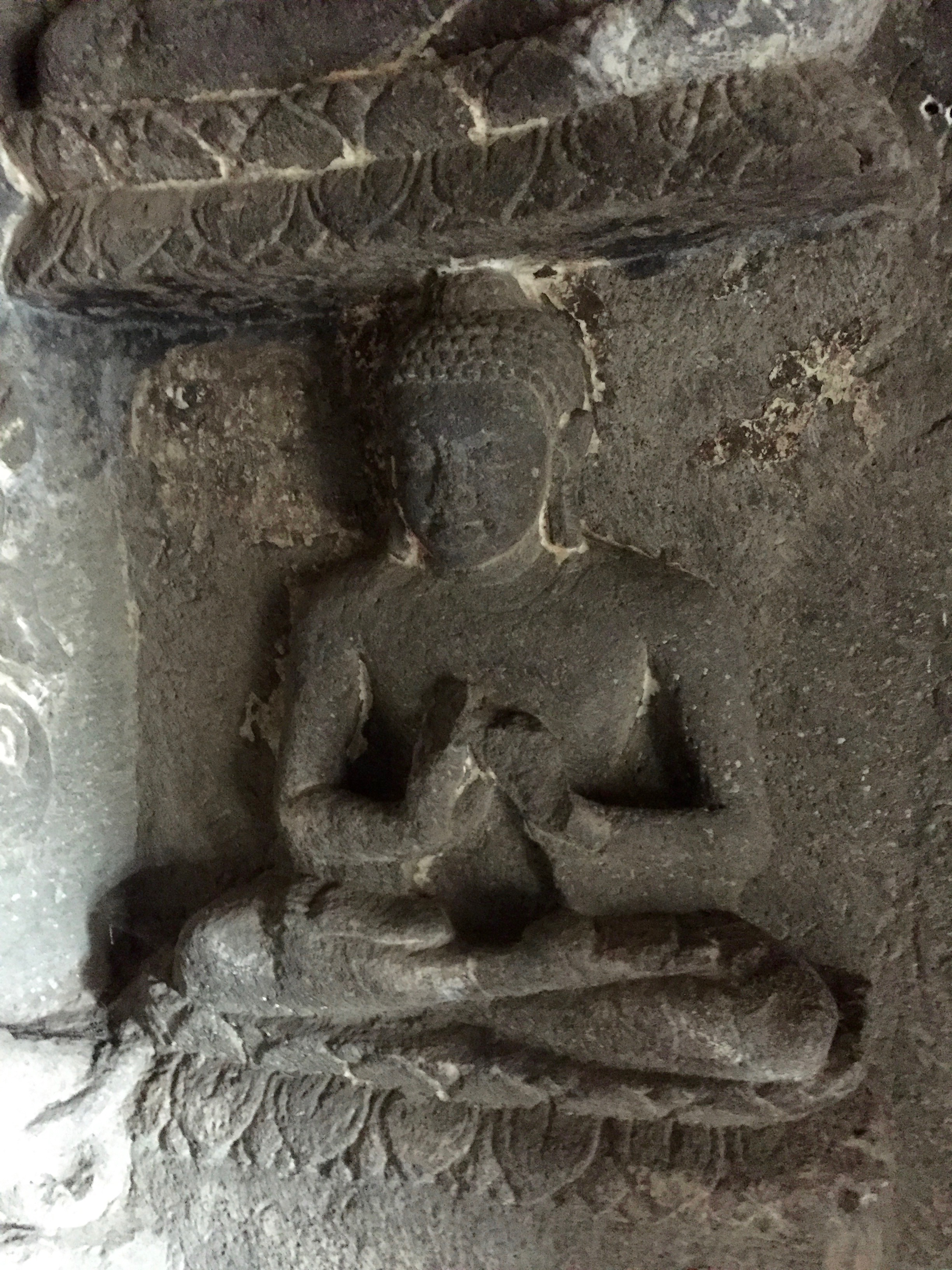
Meditating Buddha

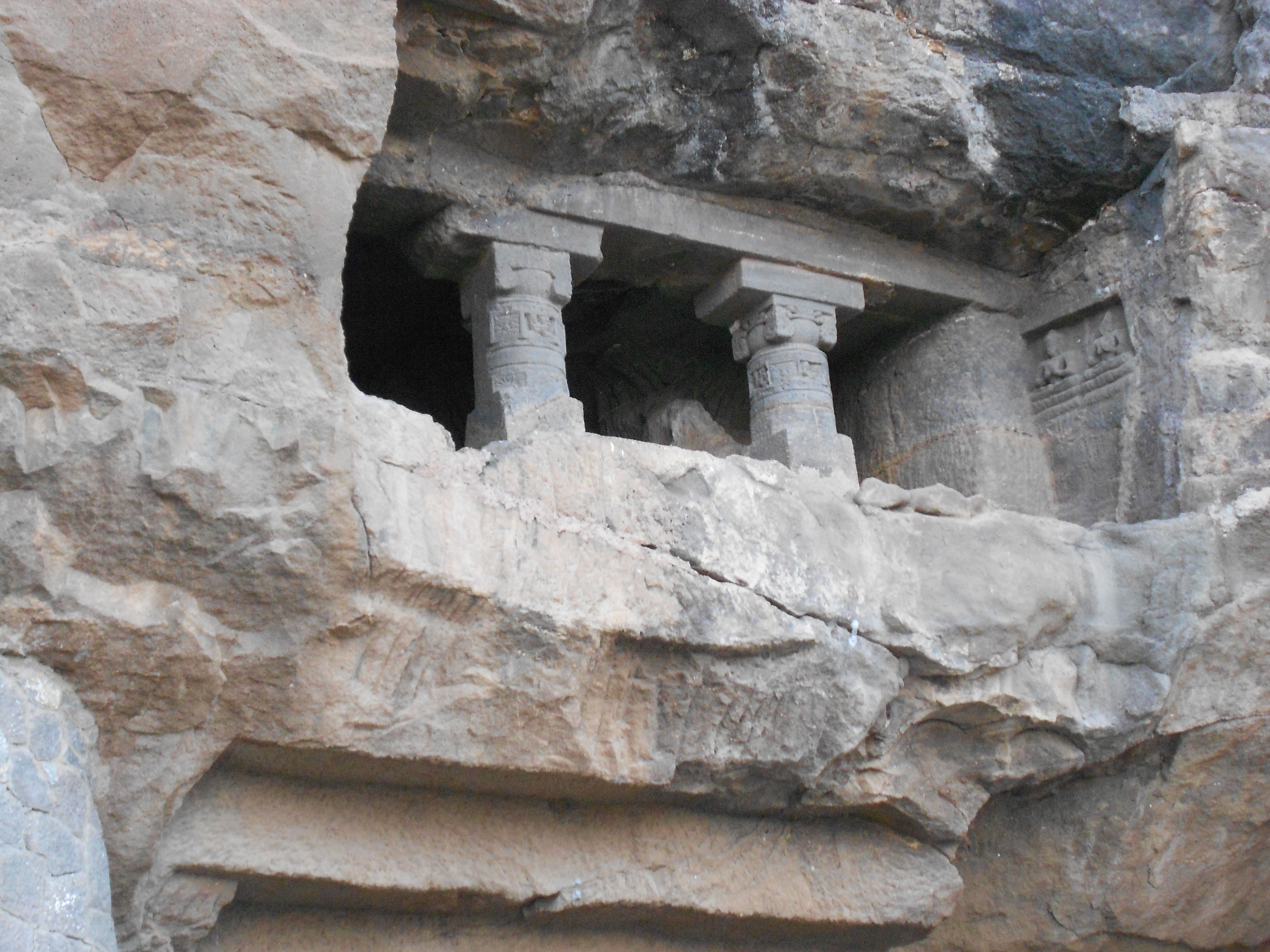
A close view of the sealed part of Aurangabad Caves

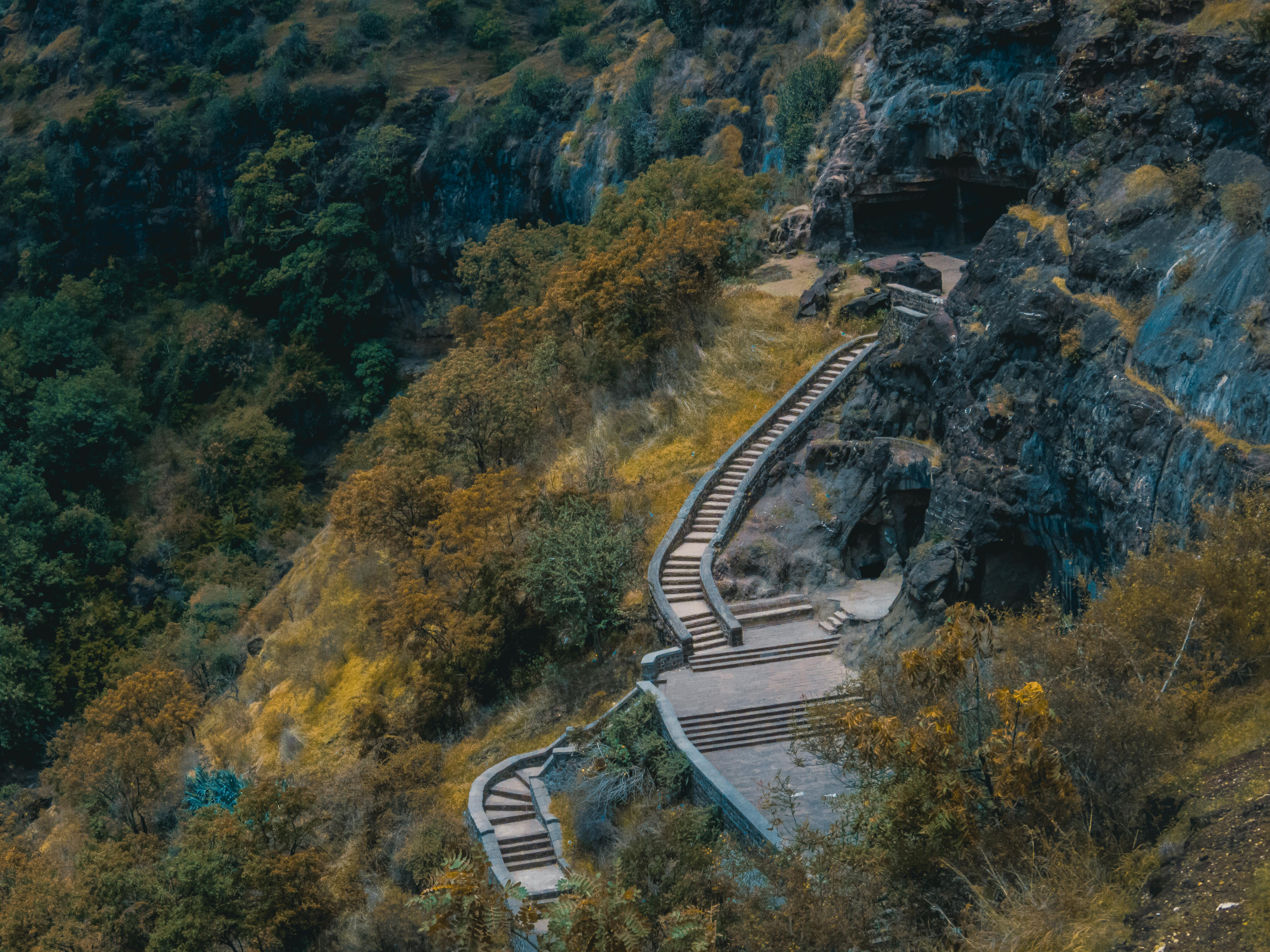
Approach to Aurangabad Caves

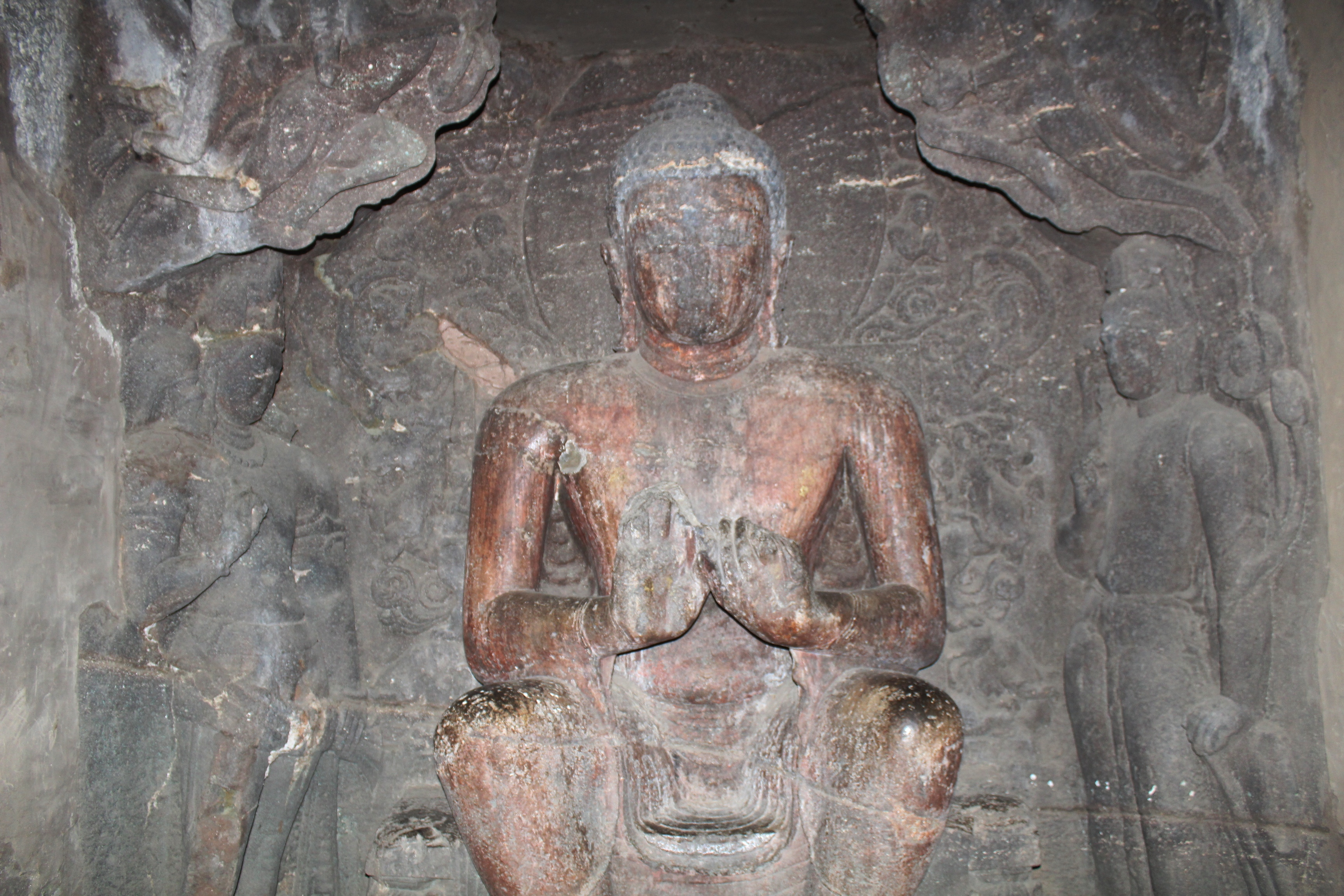
Aurangabad Caves 41

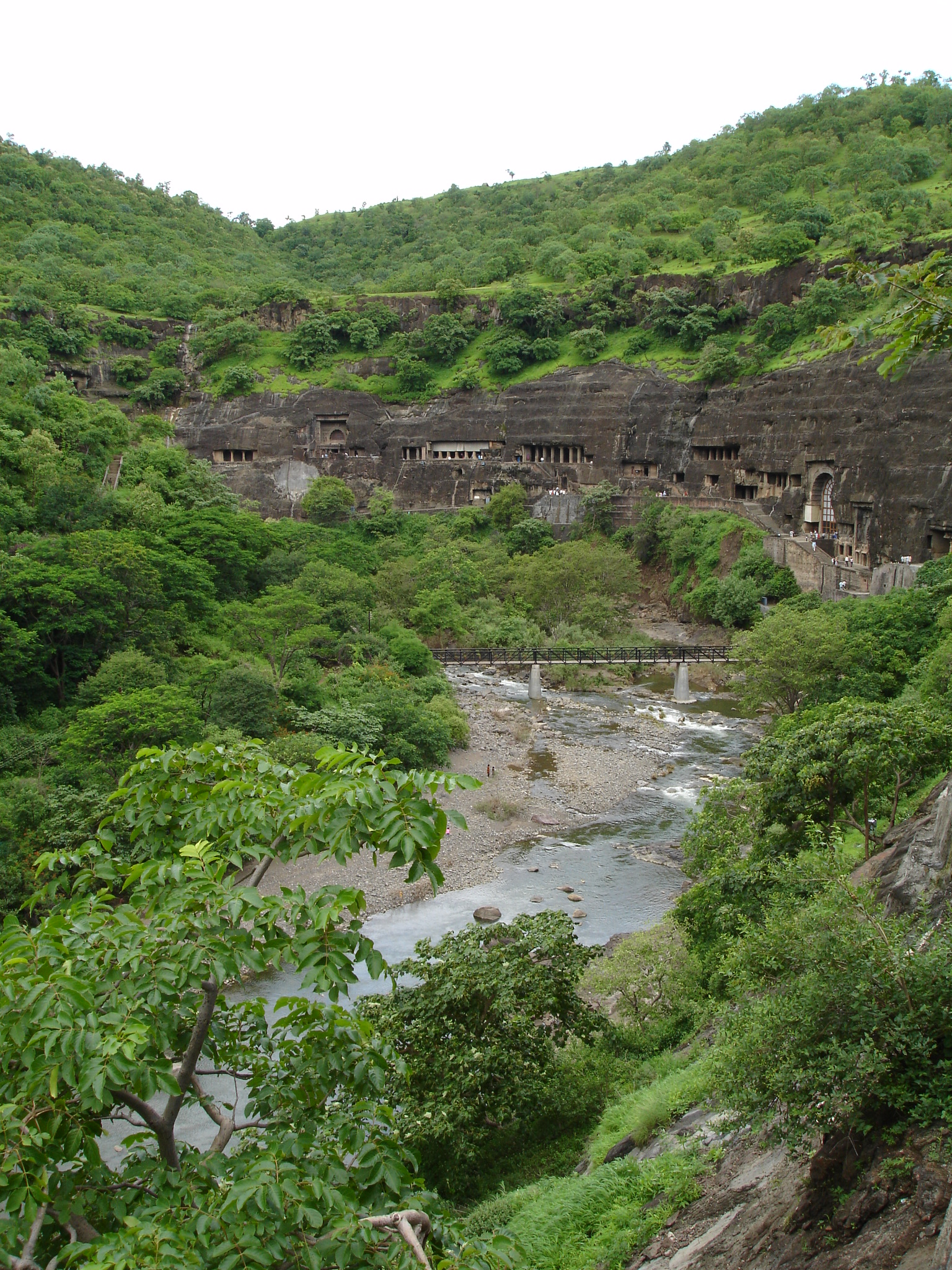

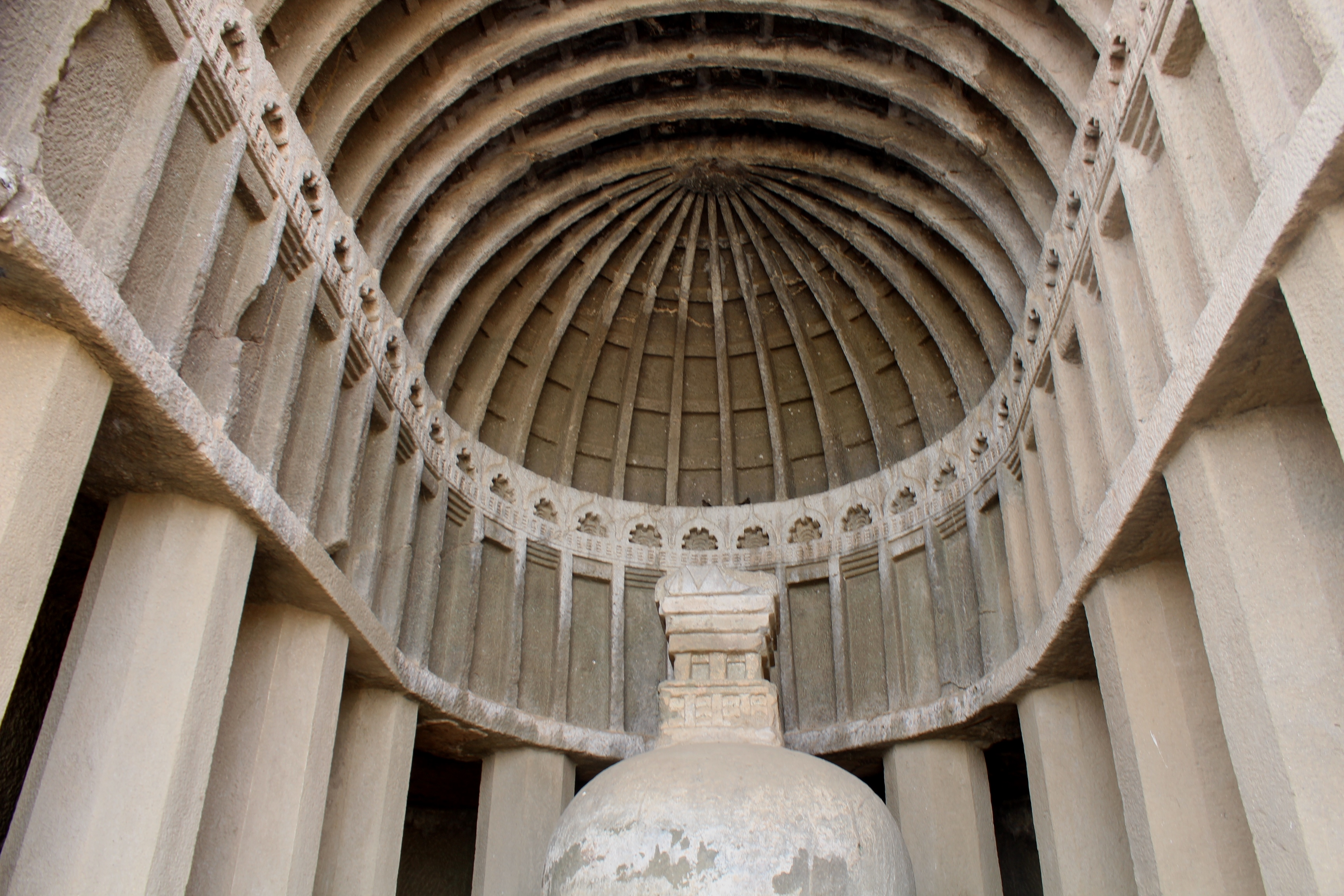
Aurangabad Caves 97

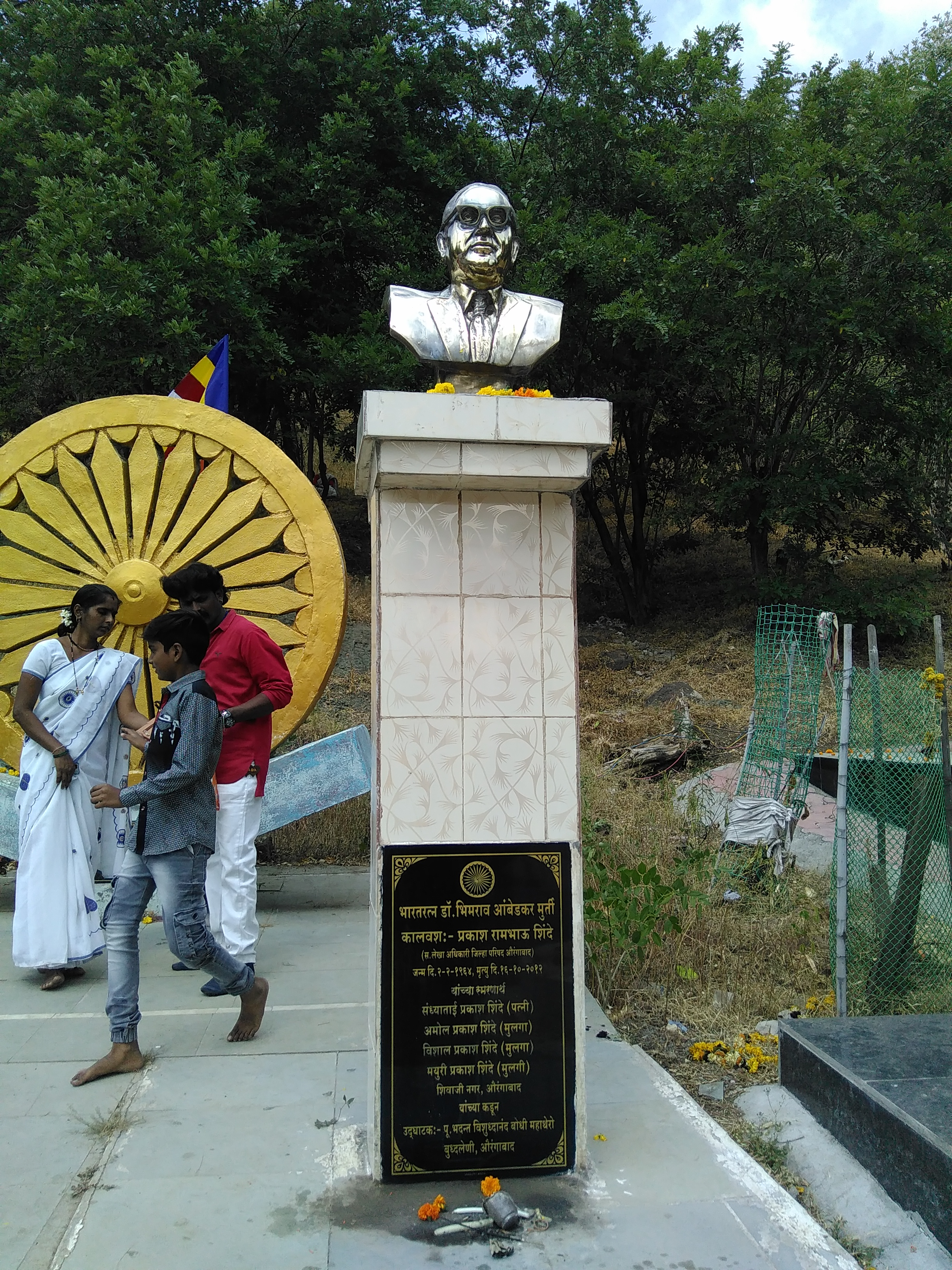

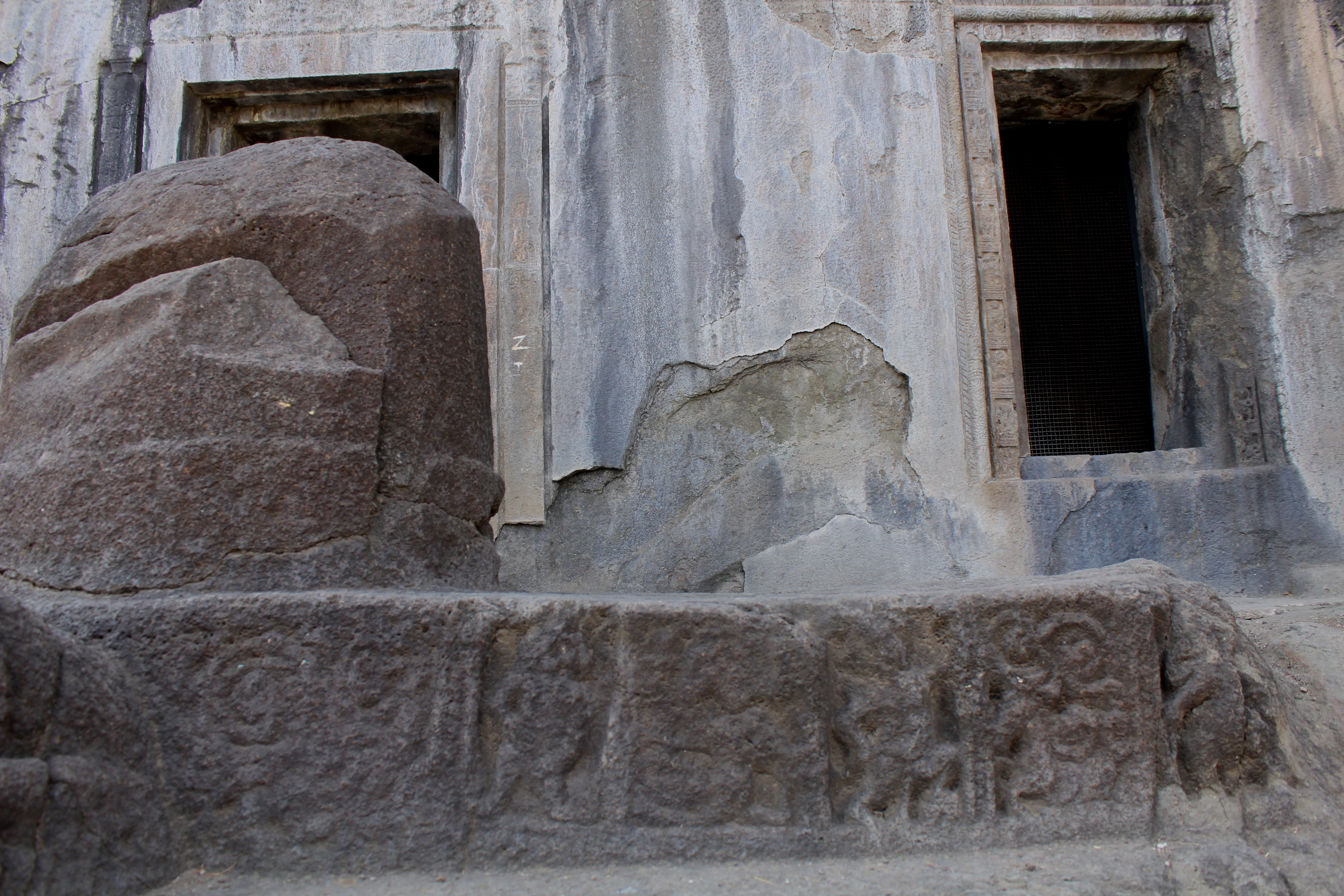
Aurangabad Caves 101

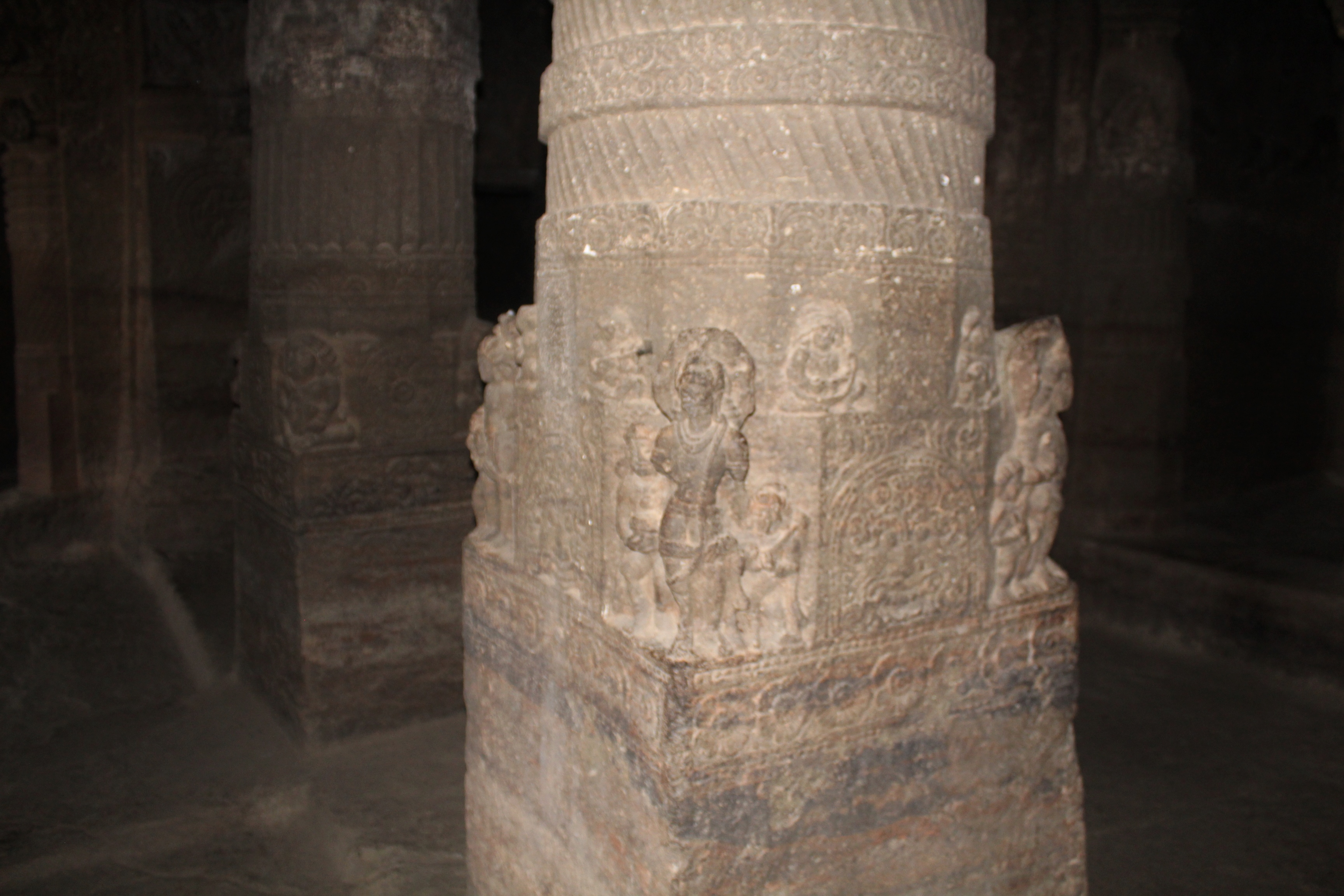
Aurangabad Caves 127

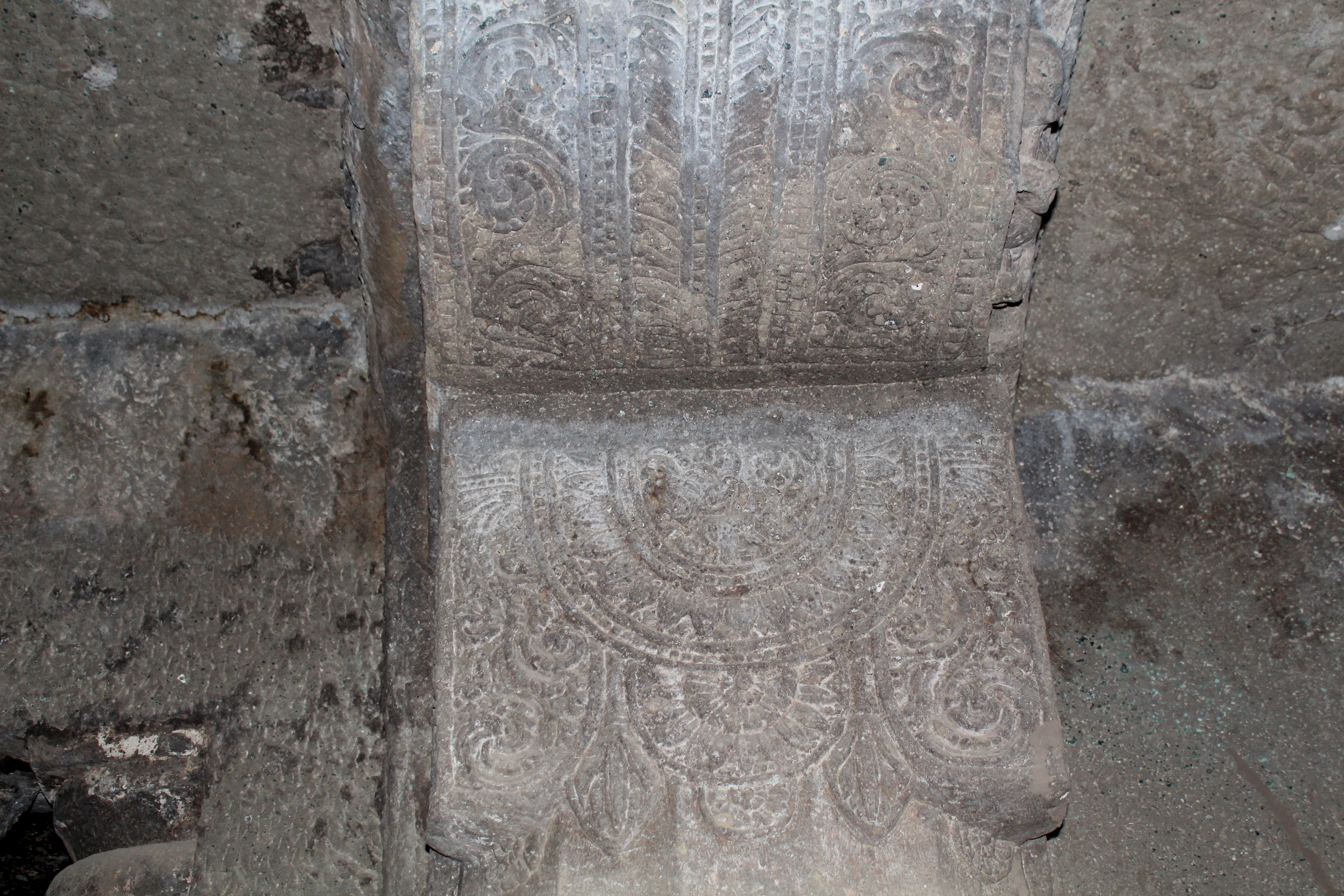
Aurangabad Caves 109

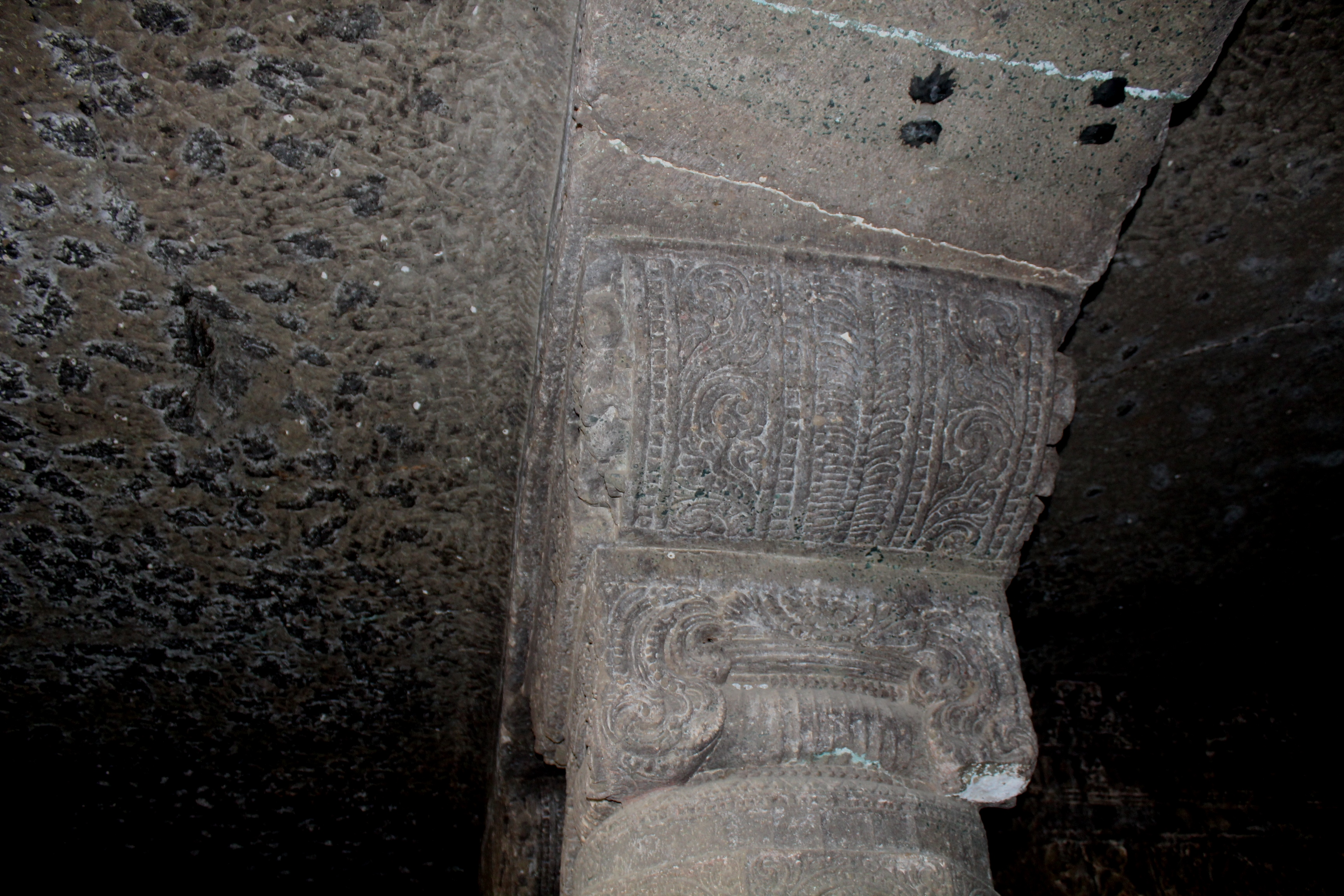
Aurangabad Caves 116

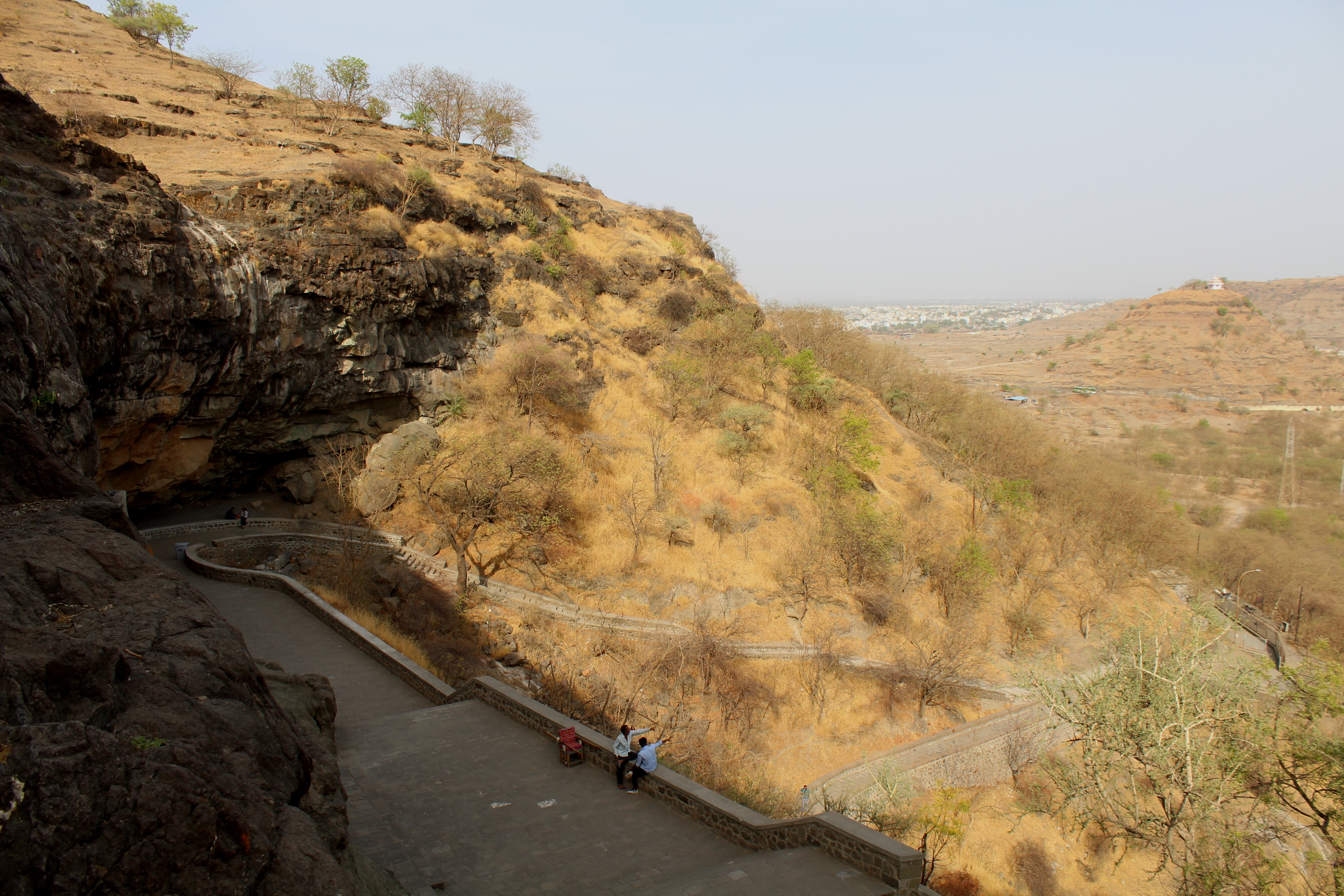
Aurangabad Caves 184

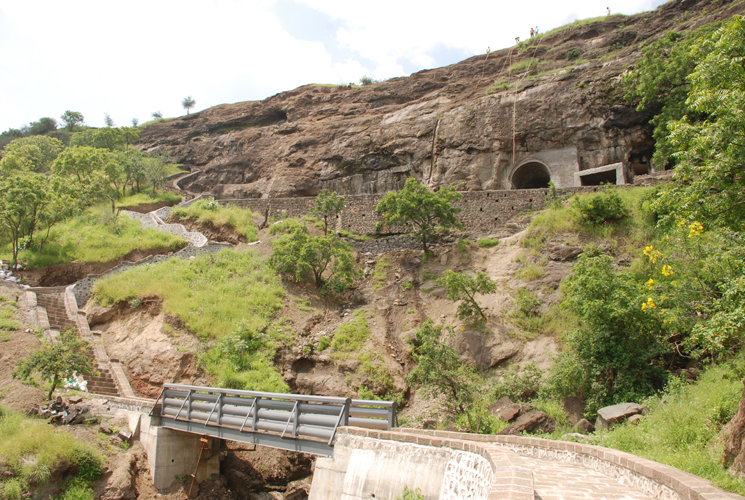

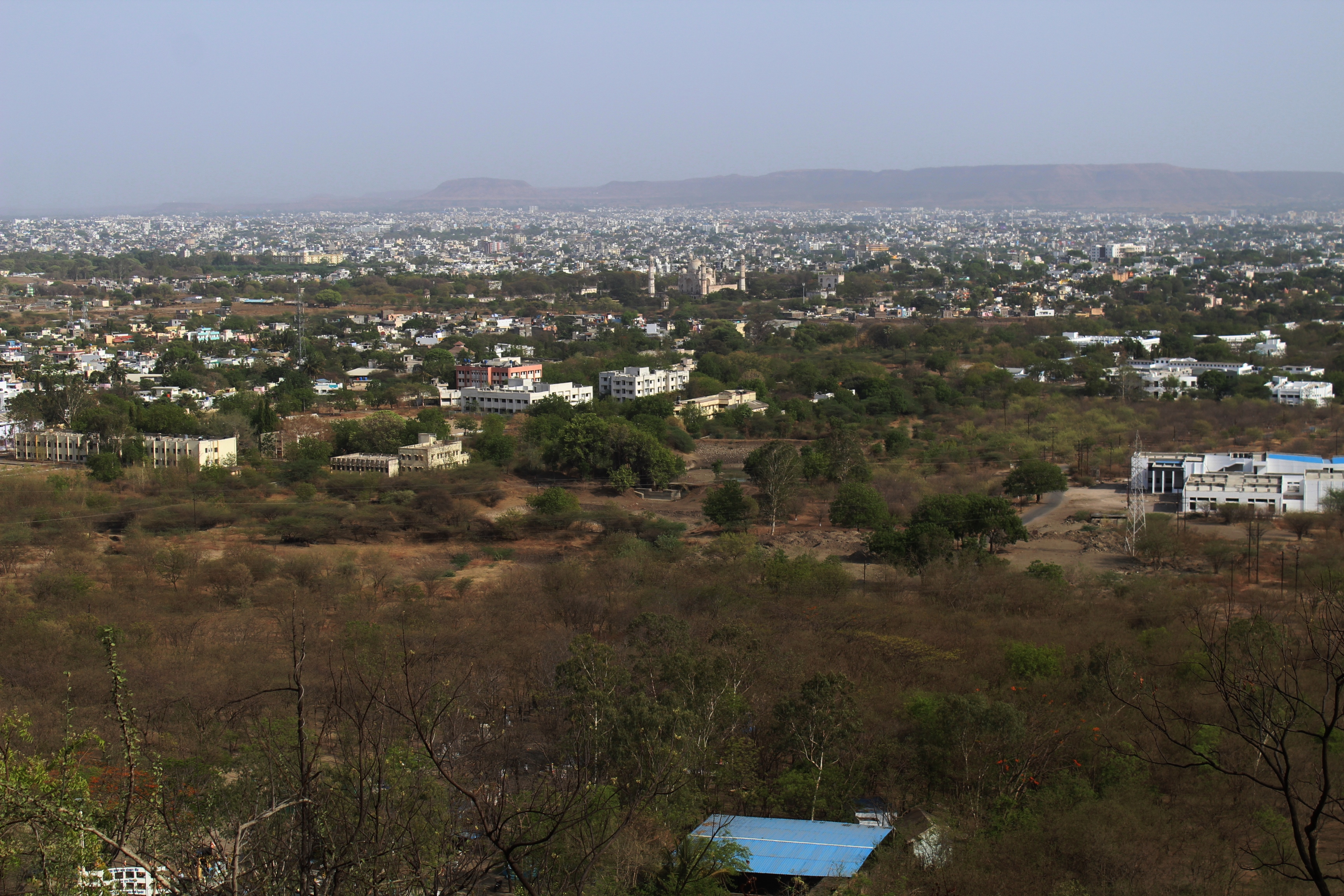

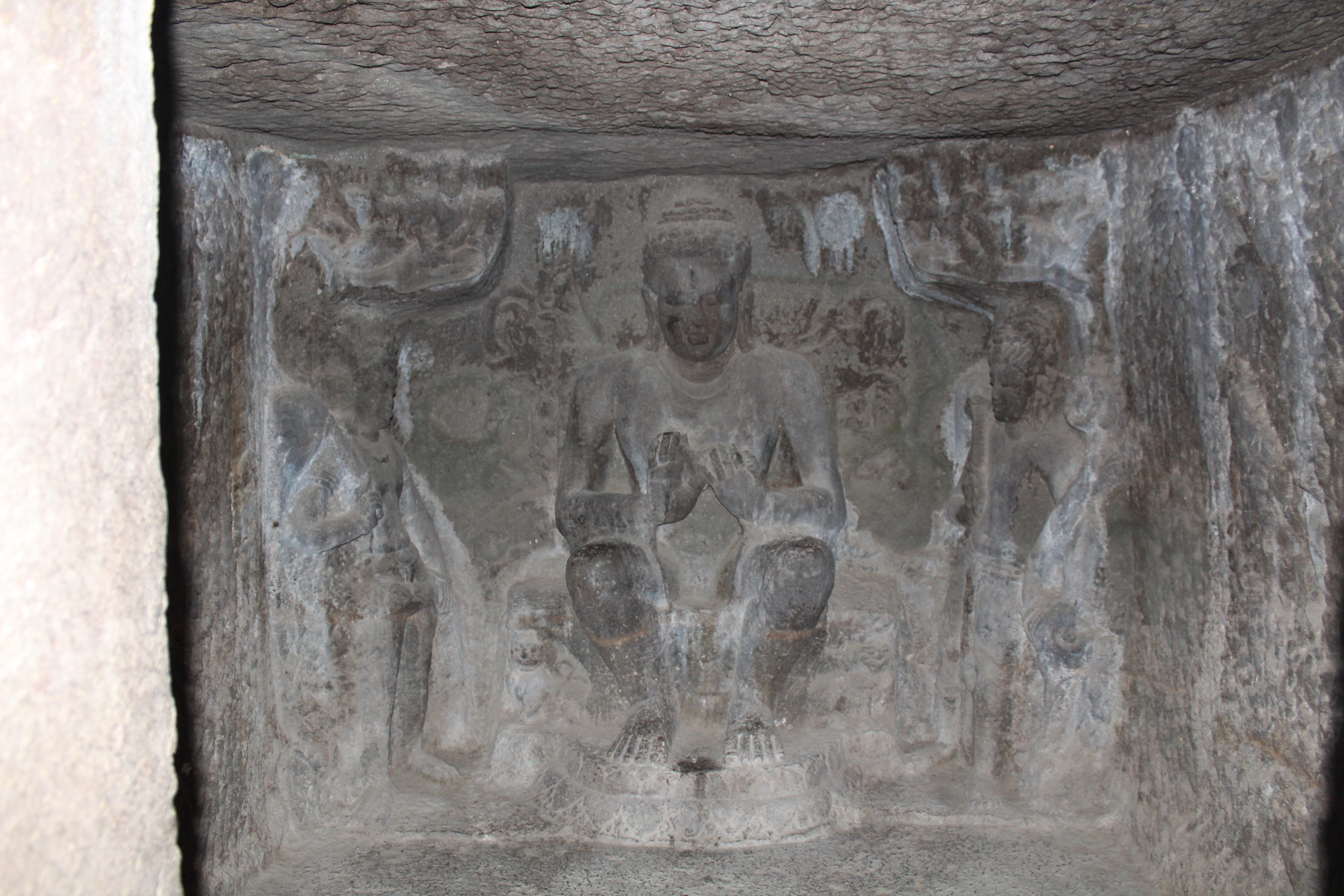
Aurangabad Caves 24

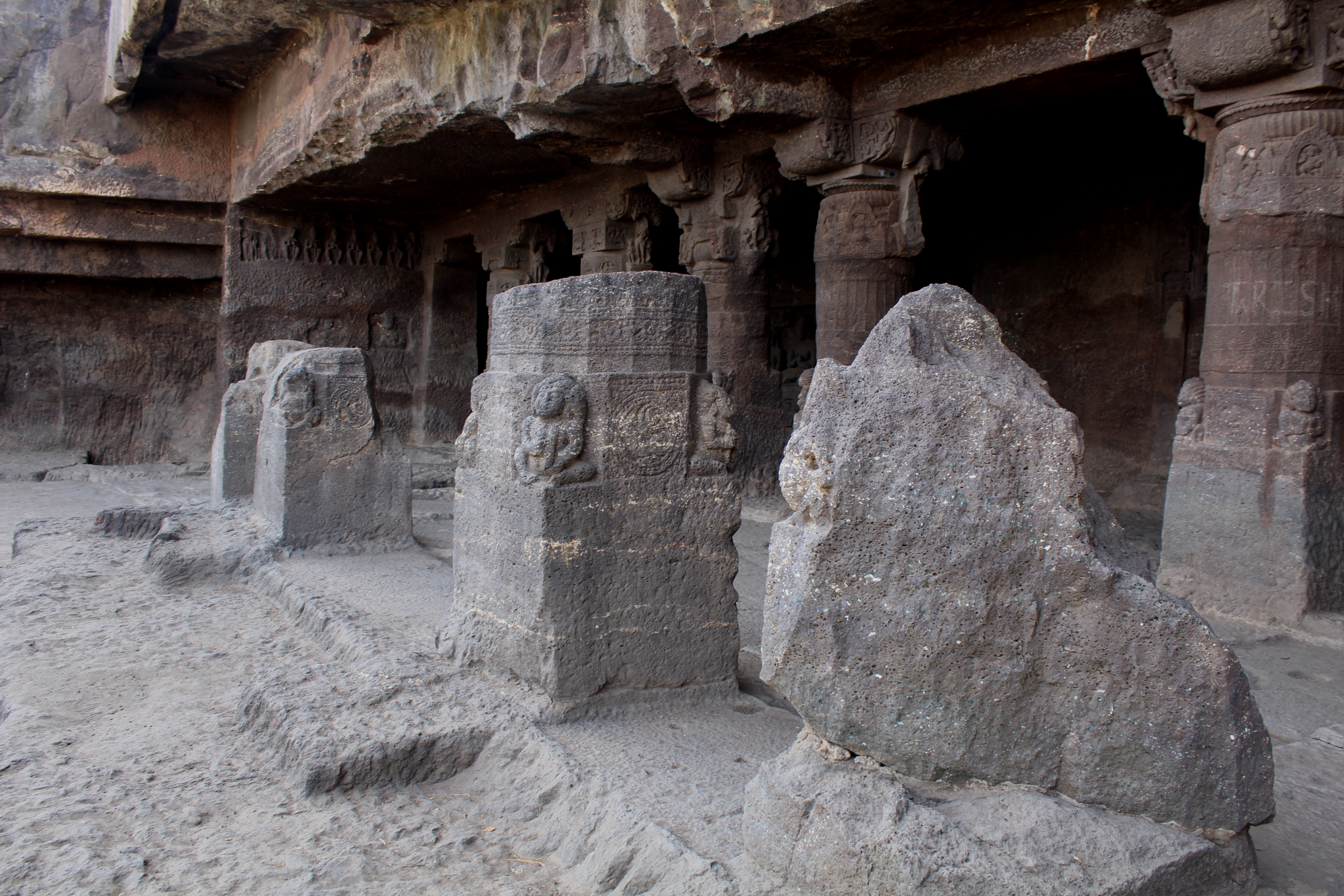
Aurangabad Caves 164

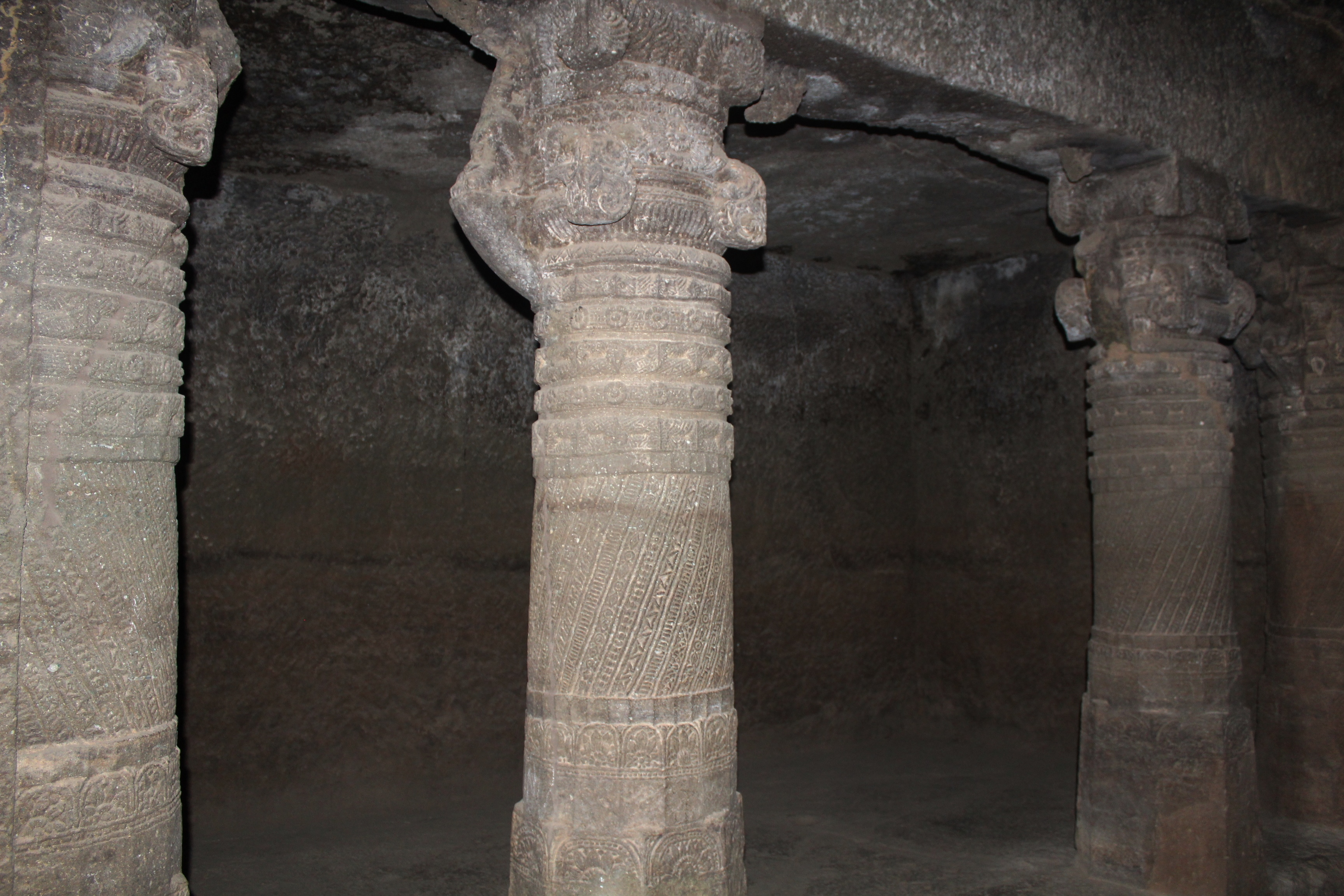
Aurangabad Caves 120

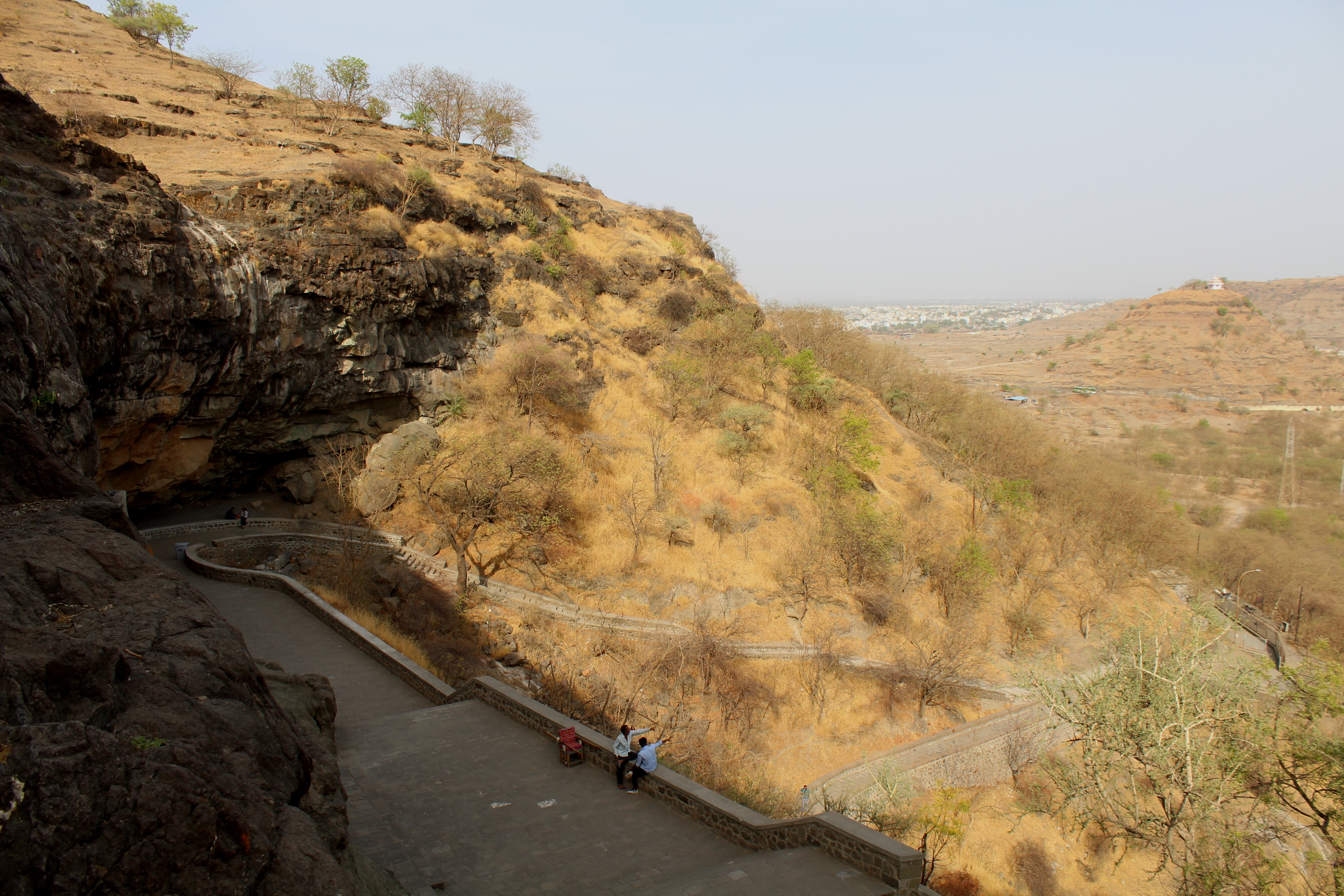
Aurangabad Caves

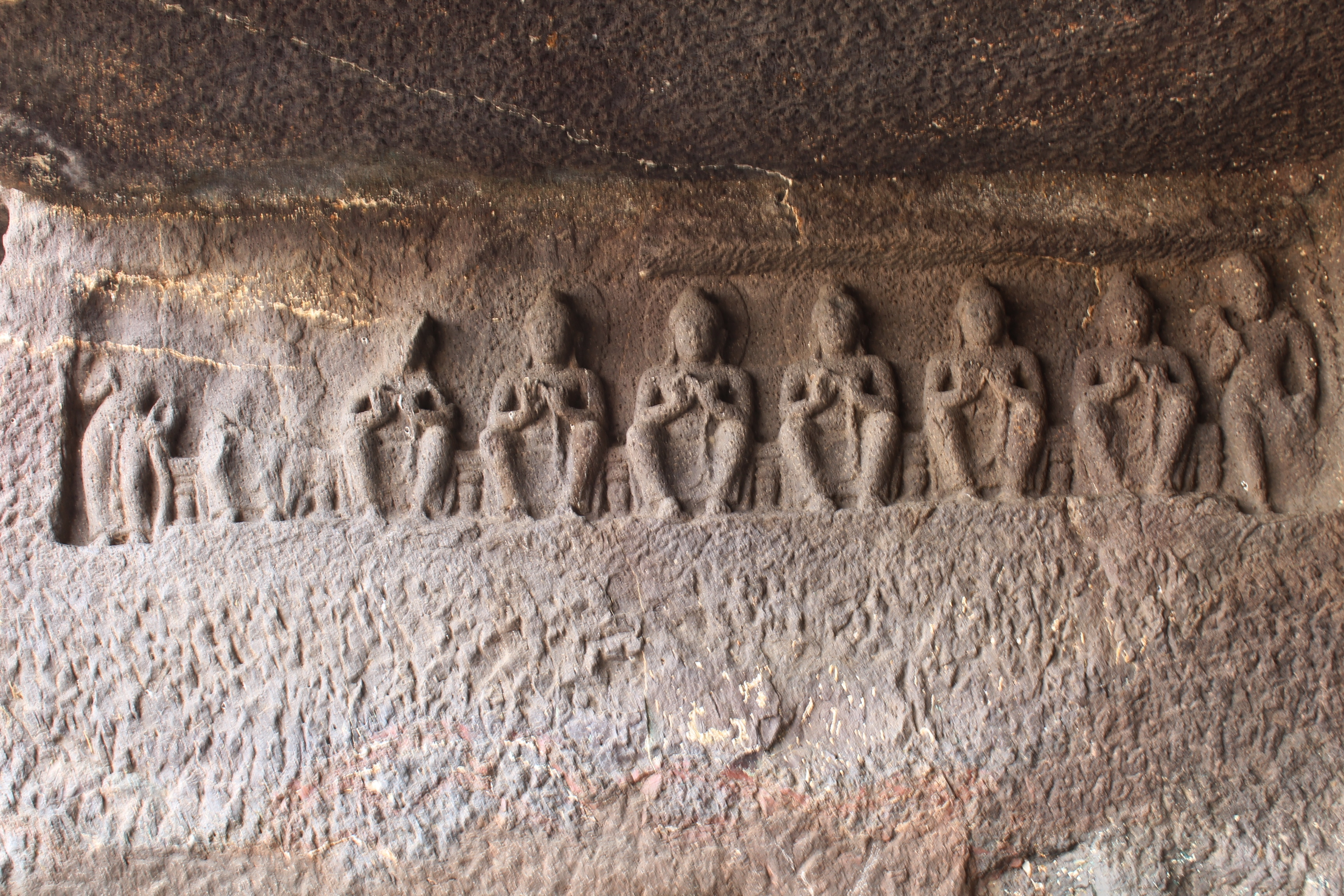
Aurangabad Caves 177

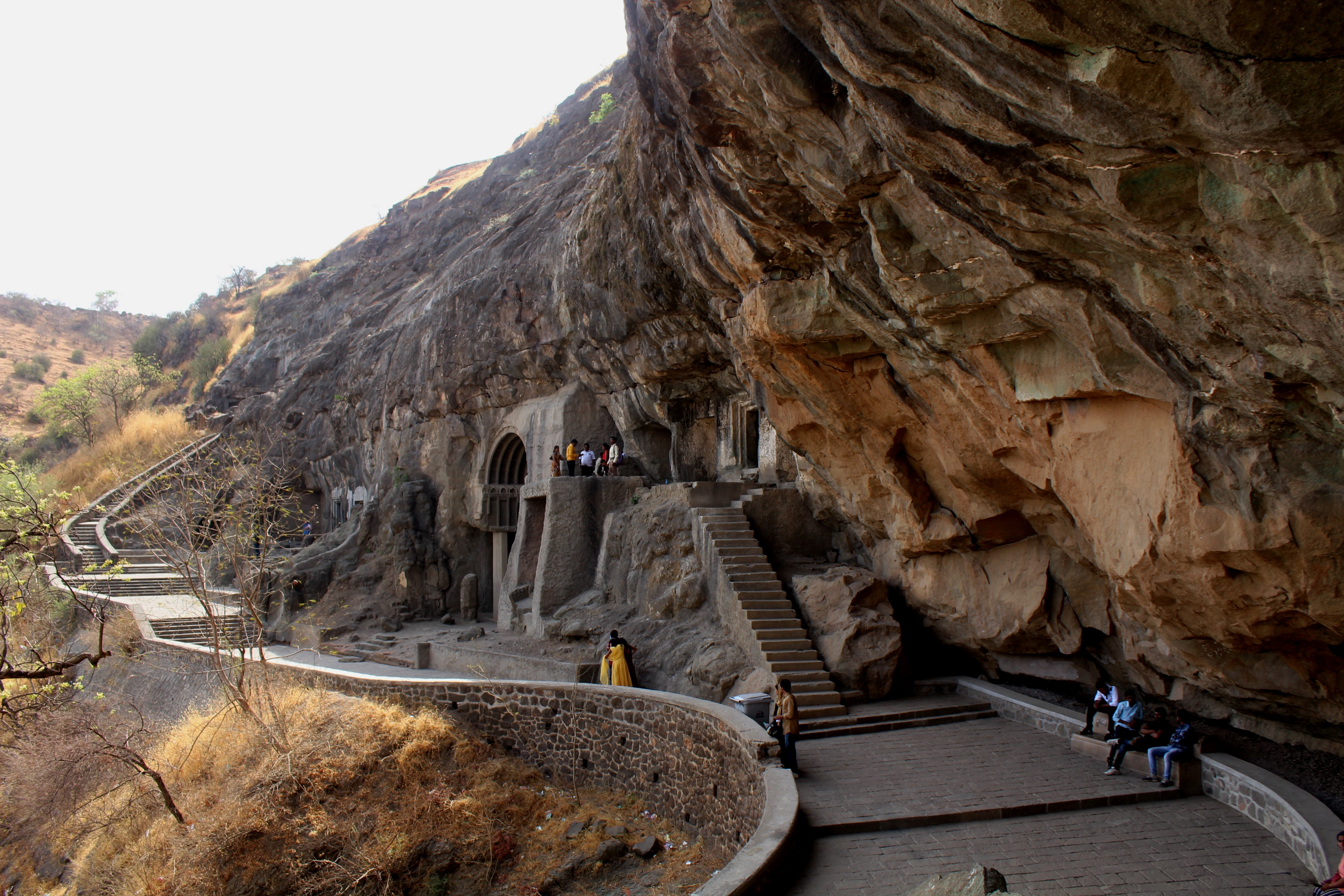
Aurangabad Caves

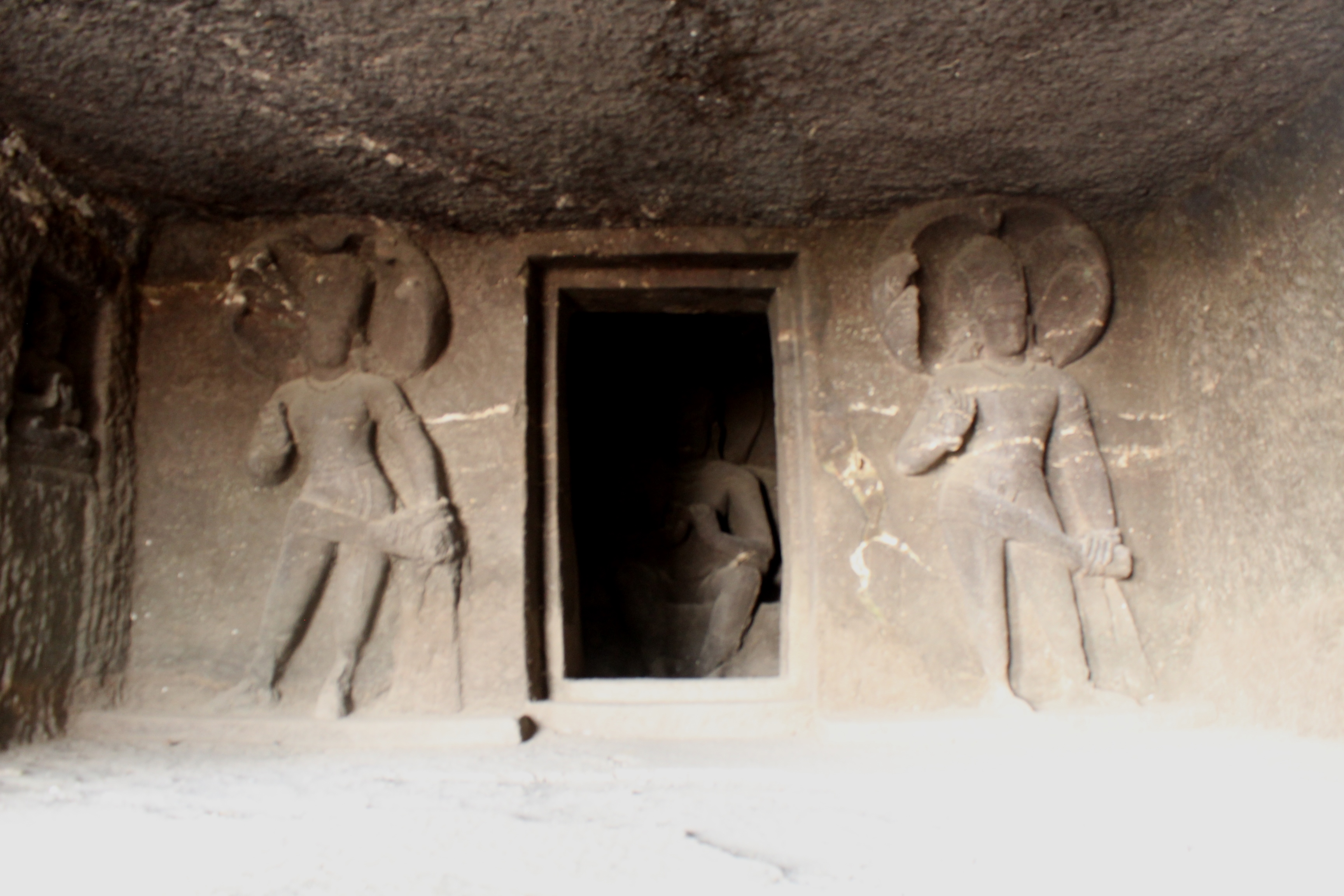
Aurangabad Caves

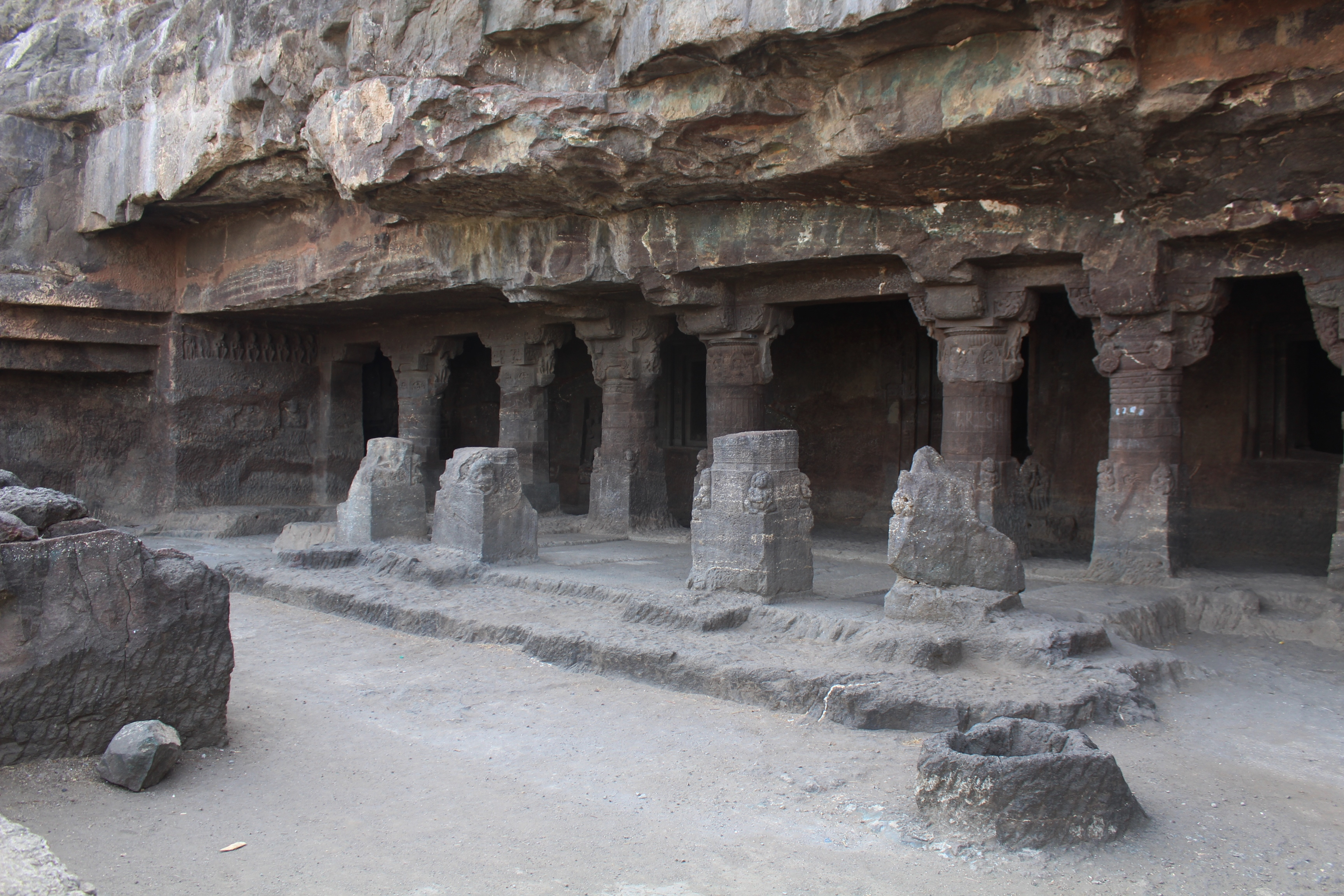
Stone pillars at Aurangabad caves 183

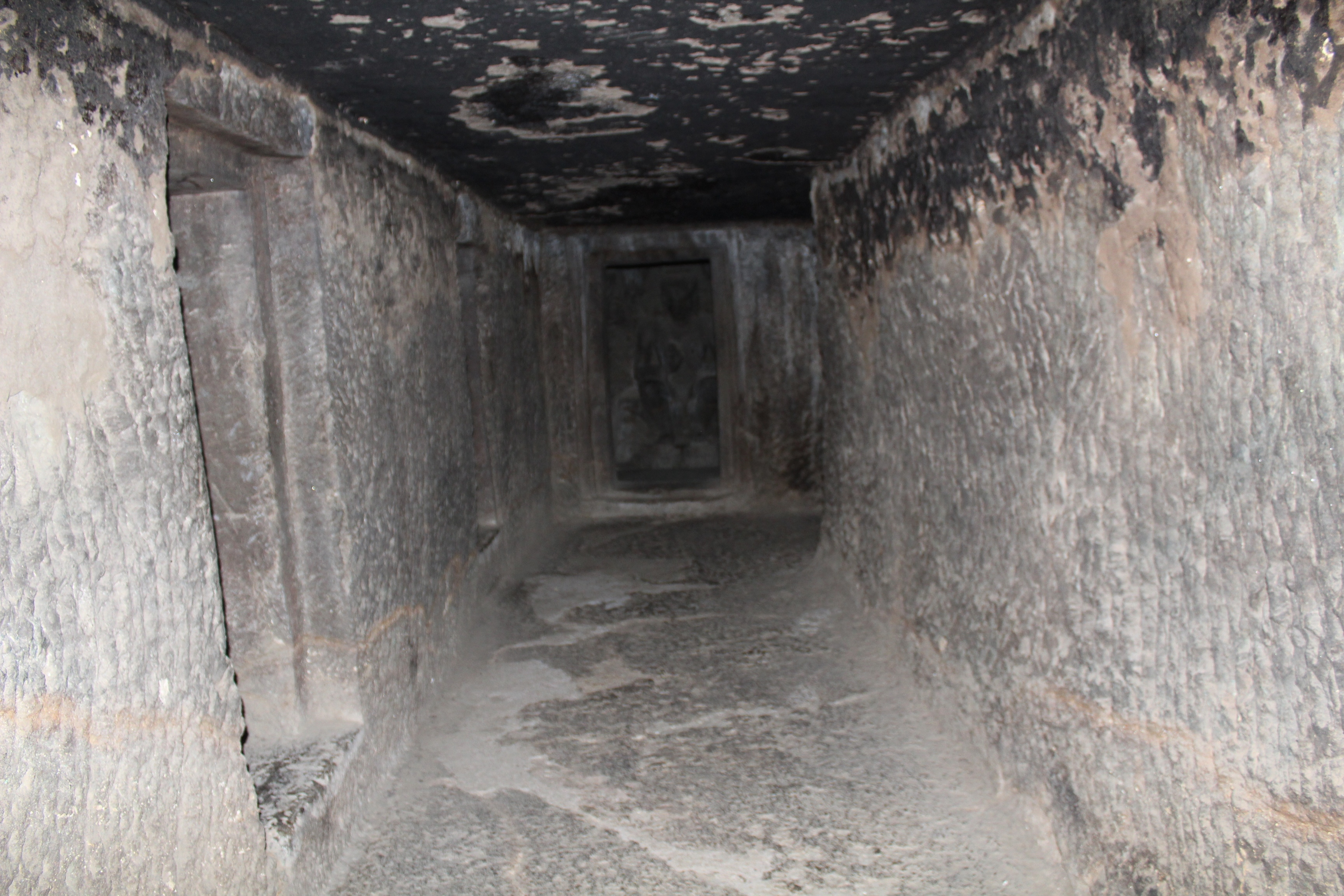
Aurangabad Caves 22

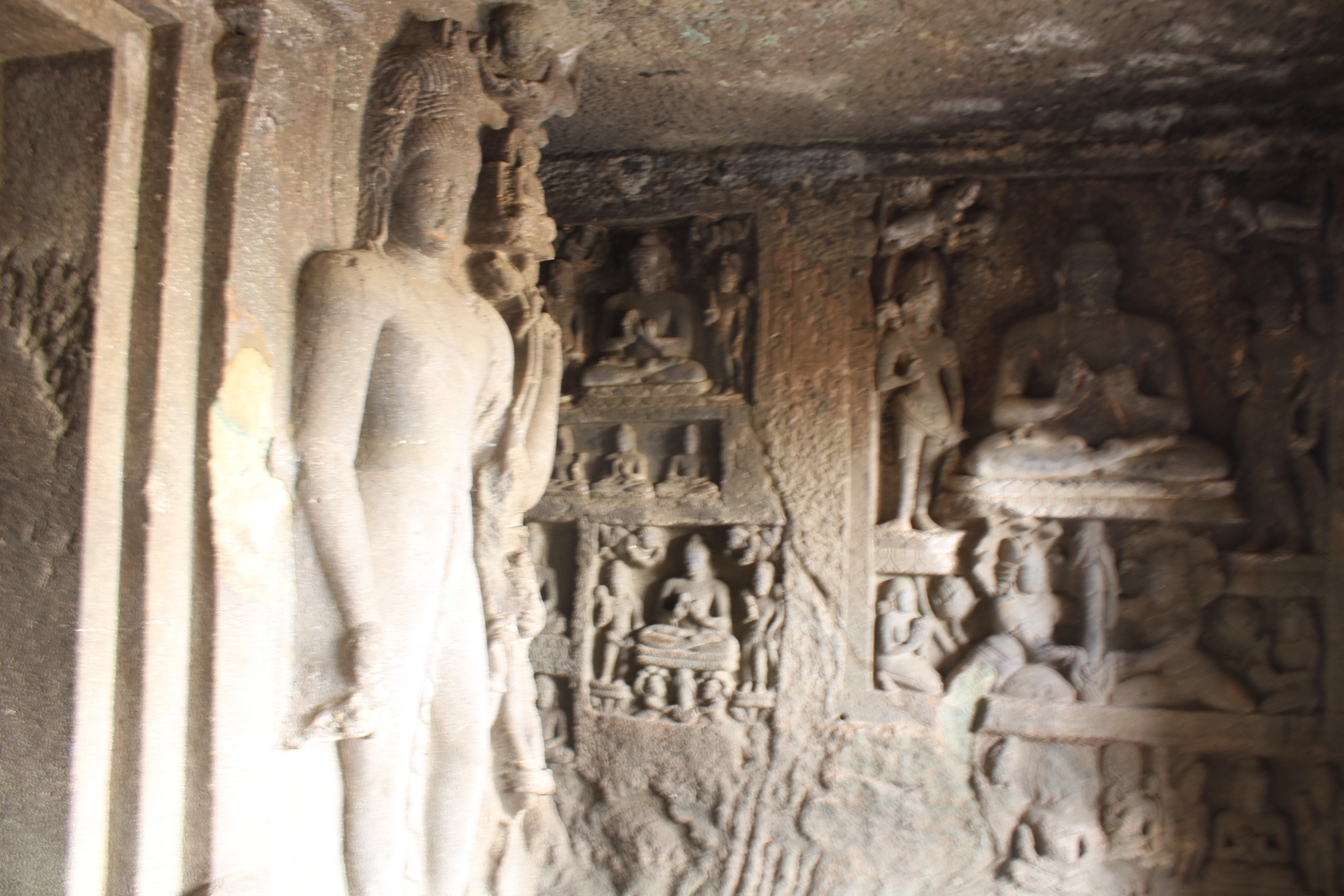
Aurangabad Caves 145

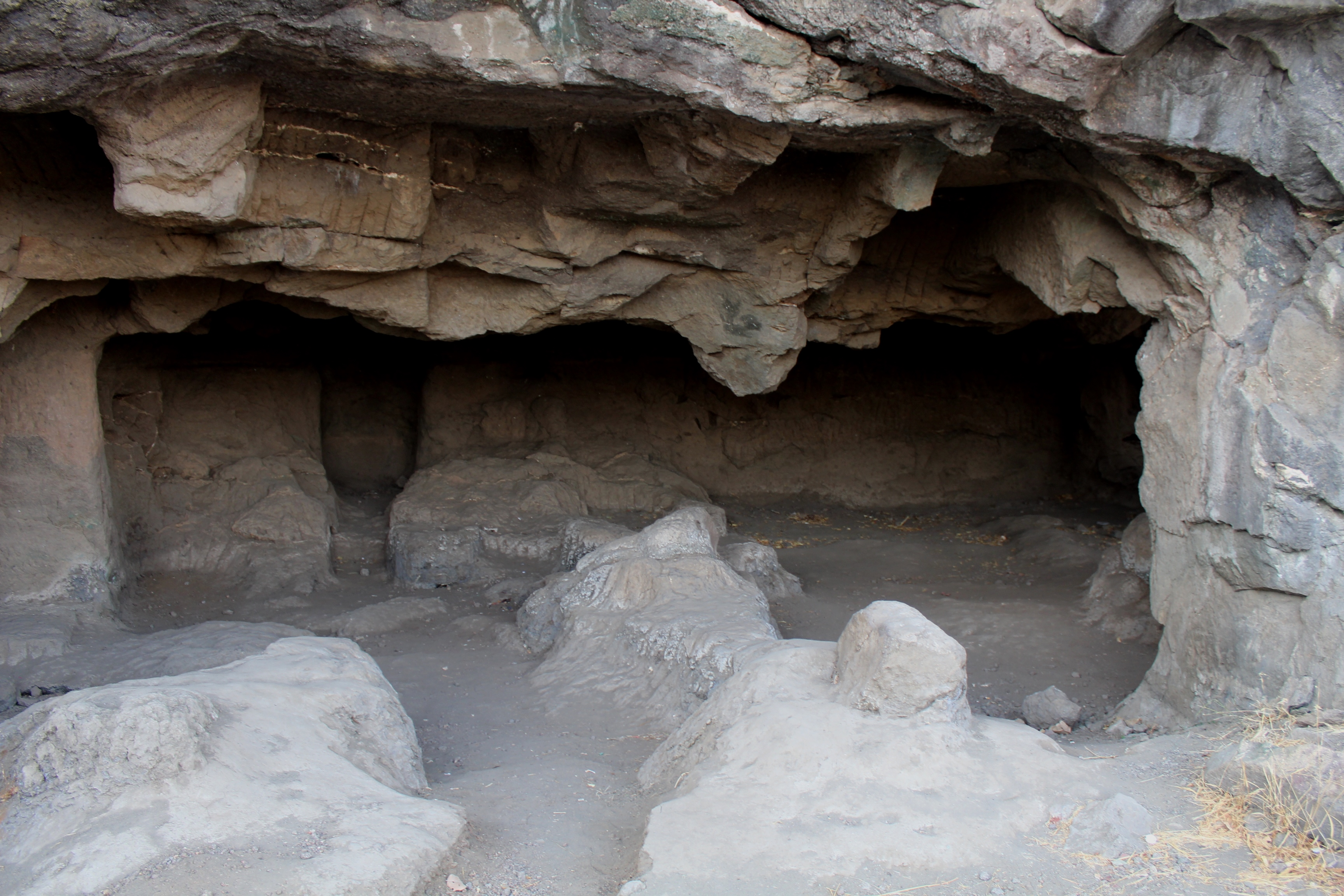
Aurangabad Caves 69

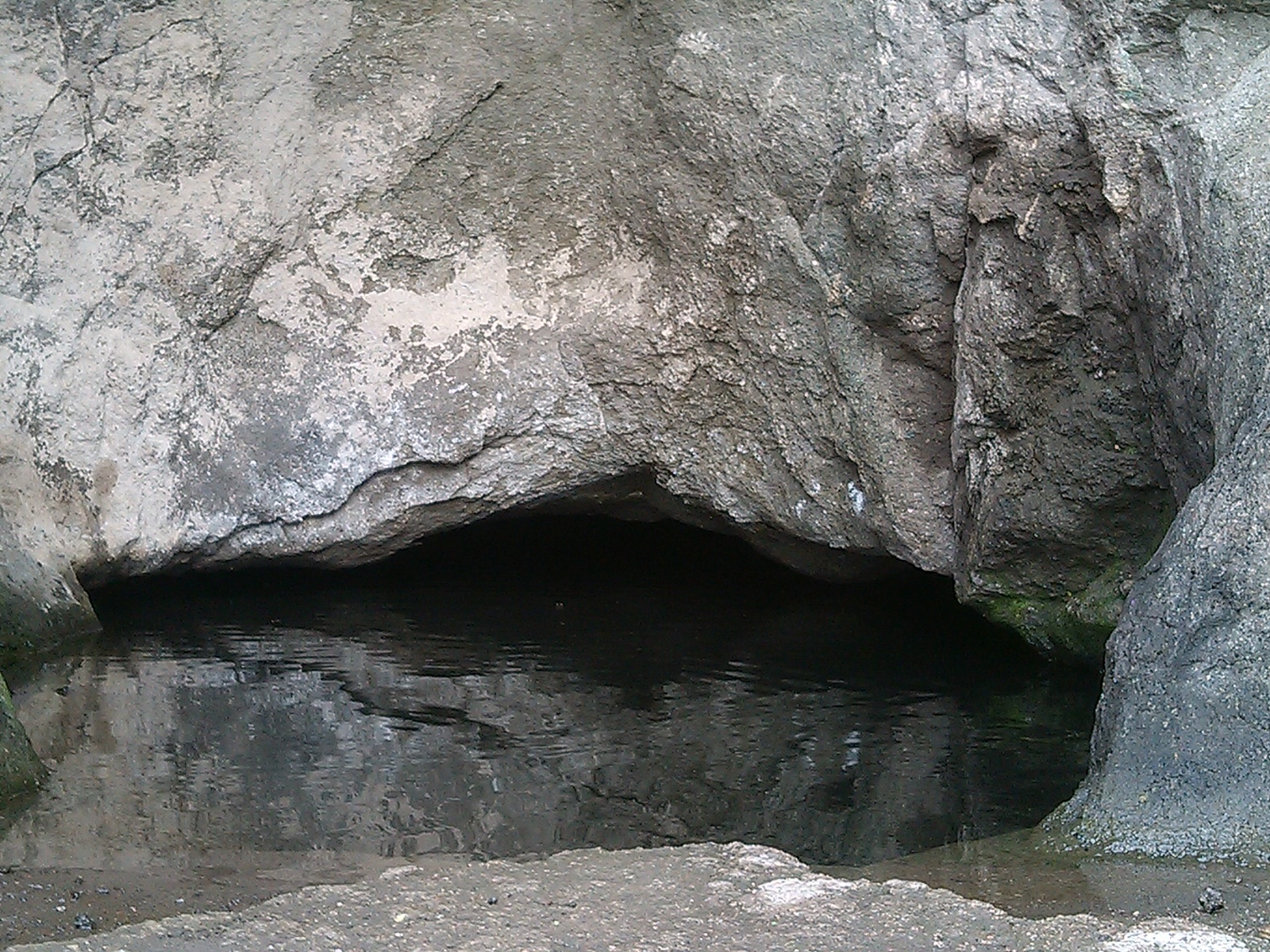
Aquifer at Aurangabad Caves

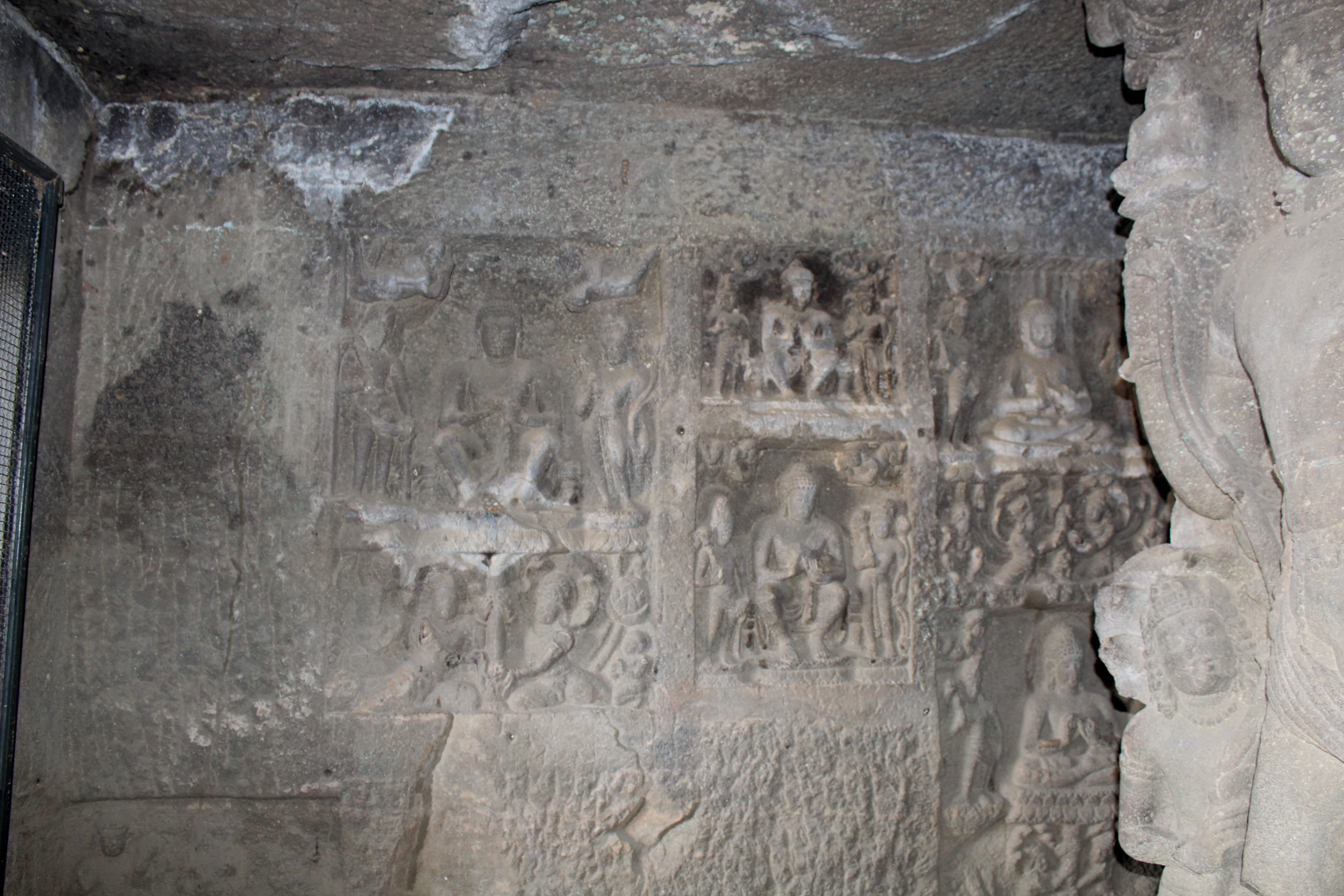
Aurangabad Caves 147

== External sources ==
- Video of Aurangabad Caves

Language:Gujarati
