= Milton Hebald =

American artist

Milton Elting Hebald (May 24, 1917 – January 5, 2015) was a sculptor who specialized in figurative bronze works. Twenty-three of his works are displayed in public in New York City, including the statues of Romeo and Juliet and The Tempest in front of the Delacorte Theatre in Central Park. His major work is a 220-foot (67 m), 12-piece "Zodiac Screen", then the largest sculpture in the world, commissioned by Pan-American Airlines for its terminal at John F. Kennedy International Airport, and now owned and stored by the Port Authority of New York and New Jersey.

== Early life ==
Hebald was born in New York City. He studied at several New York art schools, starting at the age of ten, including the Art Students League of New York, the National Academy of Design and the Beaux-Arts Institute of Design. In New York City he taught at the Art Students League, The Cooper Union, American Artists School and also privately. He also taught at the Brooklyn Museum of Art, Skowhegan School of Art, in Maine, and at the University of Minnesota. He has been a guest lecturer and teacher at many other academic institutions.

Hebald had his first one-man show at the age of 20, in New York City. He is currently exclusively represented by the Pushkin Gallery in Santa Fe, New Mexico.

Hebald was awarded the Prix de Rome Fellowship to the American Academy in Rome in 1955, 1956, and 1957. He stayed in Italy, living in Rome, with his wife, painter, Cecille Rosner Hebald, until 1970 when they moved to Bracciano, 25 miles outside Rome. In 2004, six years after his wife's death, he returned to the United States. Hebald lived in Los Angeles at the time of his death. near to his daughter, Margo Hebald (a.k.a. Margo Hebald-Heymann), Architect, granddaughter Lara Hebald Embry and great-granddaughter Cecille Tuccillo all of whom live in California.

== Work ==
Hebald created a series of pieces in 1960 featuring representations of the Zodiac on the exterior of the Pan American World Airways Worldport at John F. Kennedy International Airport in New York City. A 200-foot-long (61 m) and 24-foot-high (7.3 m) windscreen in front of the terminal's entrance was adorned with bas relief representations of the 12 signs of the zodiac, visible from both outside and inside the terminal building. When it was created, it was the largest such work in the world. As part of renovations, the Port Authority of New York and New Jersey removed the sculptures, and have recently been moved to Building 111 on airport. Hebald has created a pair of statues in front of Central Park's Delacorte Theatre. The bronze unveiled in 1966 features Prospero, the protagonist of William Shakespeare's play The Tempest. The piece was a gift of George T. Delacorte Jr., who also donated the Delacorte Theatre. A 14-foot (4.3 m) bronze of Prospero and Miranda by Hebald was dedicated in Central Park in honor of Joseph Papp, founder of the New York Shakespeare Festival. Hebald's sculpture of Romeo and Juliet was dedicated outside the Delacorte Theater in 1977.

Hebald created a bust of operatic tenor Richard Tucker for Richard Tucker Park, located in front of Lincoln Center, at the corner of Broadway and Columbus Avenue at 66th Street. Dedicated on April 20, 1980, the statue consists of a larger-than-life size bronze portrait on a 6-foot-high (1.8 m) granite pedestal. The original 1978 proposal for a seven-foot statue of Tucker, depicted in the role of Des Grieux in the opera Manon Lescaut by Giacomo Puccini, had been opposed by a member of Manhattan Community Board 7, who felt that the piece should have been placed in the Metropolitan Opera Hall of Fame, and not on public property.

In Zurich, Switzerland, Hebald was commissioned to do a life sized, full figure portrait of James Joyce, for Joyce's tomb. He also made a bust of British novelist Anthony Burgess, to whom he once also sold a house near Rome. Burgess was quoted in 1971 as saying Hebald was "without doubt the most important living figure sculptor." In Los Angeles, two of his bronze works were commissioned for the Adam's sculpture garden surrounding the Stuart Ketchum YMCA, the "Olympiad" in tribute to the 1984 Olympics held in Los Angeles, and "Handstand", depicting an acrobatic young boy which echos the "Y" logo.

== Later life ==
After living near his granddaughter and great-granddaughter in Los Angeles, and continuing to sculpt in Terra Cotta and draw, Milton Hebald died on January 5, 2015, at the age of 97, in West Hollywood, California. He was survived by his grandchildren, Lara Hebald Embry, and Sergei Hebald Heymann, and his great-grandchild, Cecille Tuccillo.
