= Statue of Abraham Lincoln (New York City) =

Statue in New York City

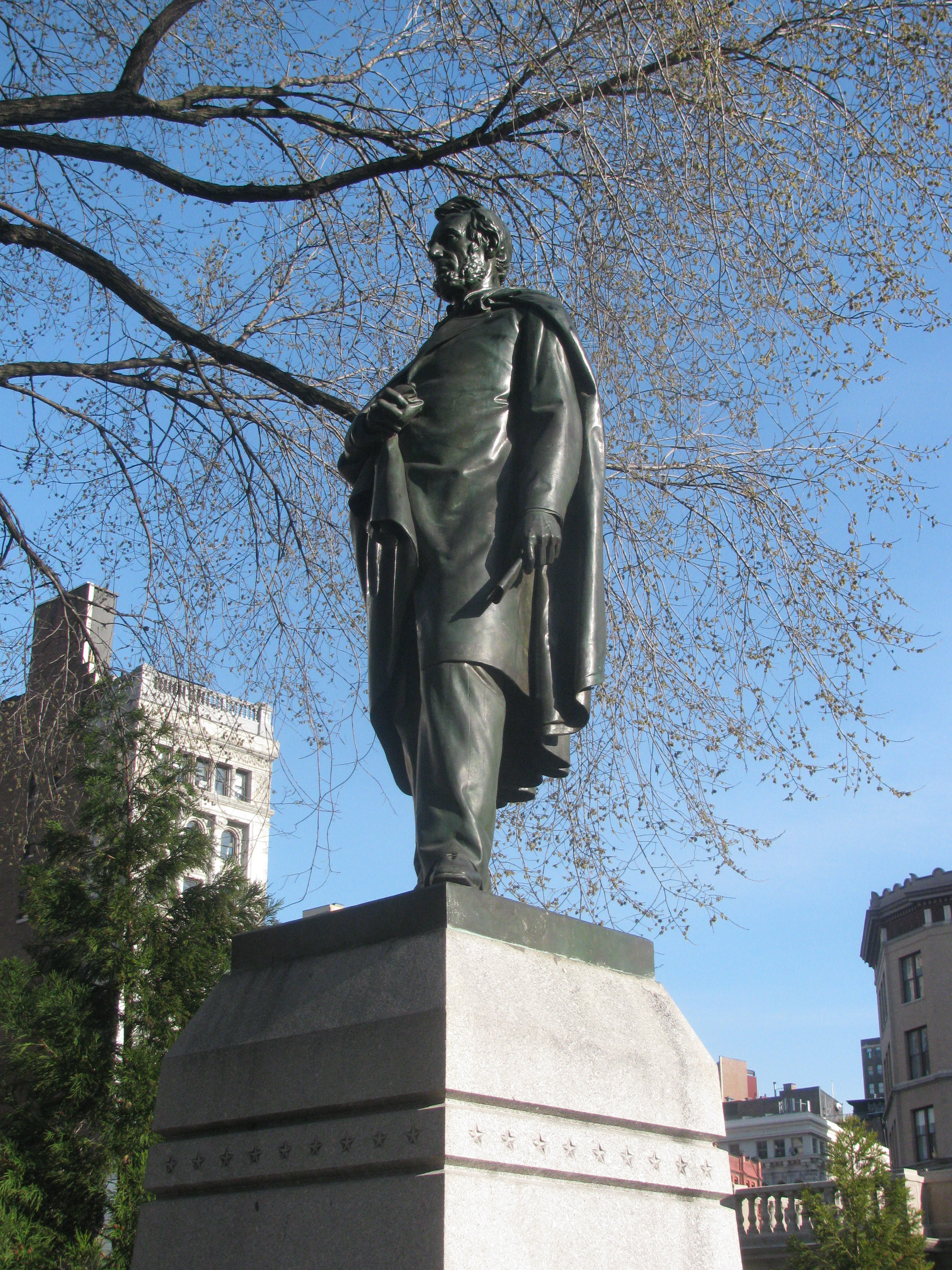
- The statue in 2010
- Artist: Henry Kirke Brown
- Year: 1870
- Type: Sculpture
- Medium: Bronze
- Subject: Abraham Lincoln
- Location: Manhattan, New York, United States; 40.73618°N 73.99013°W

This outdoor bronze statue of Abraham Lincoln by Henry Kirke Brown was installed in Union Square in Manhattan, New York on September 16th, 1870. The statue was sponsored by the Union League Club of New York.

== Description and history ==
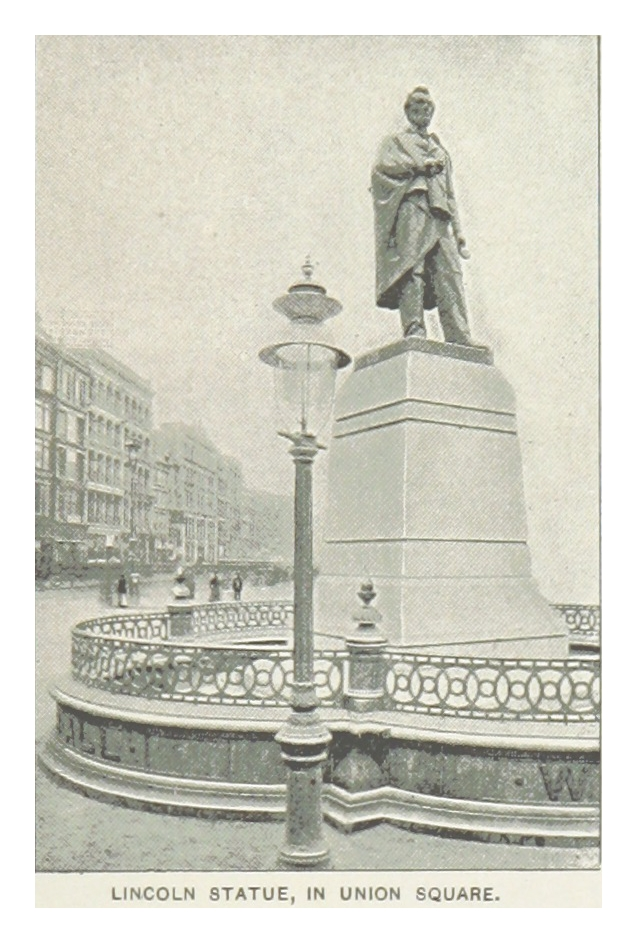
The statue with the railing in its original location

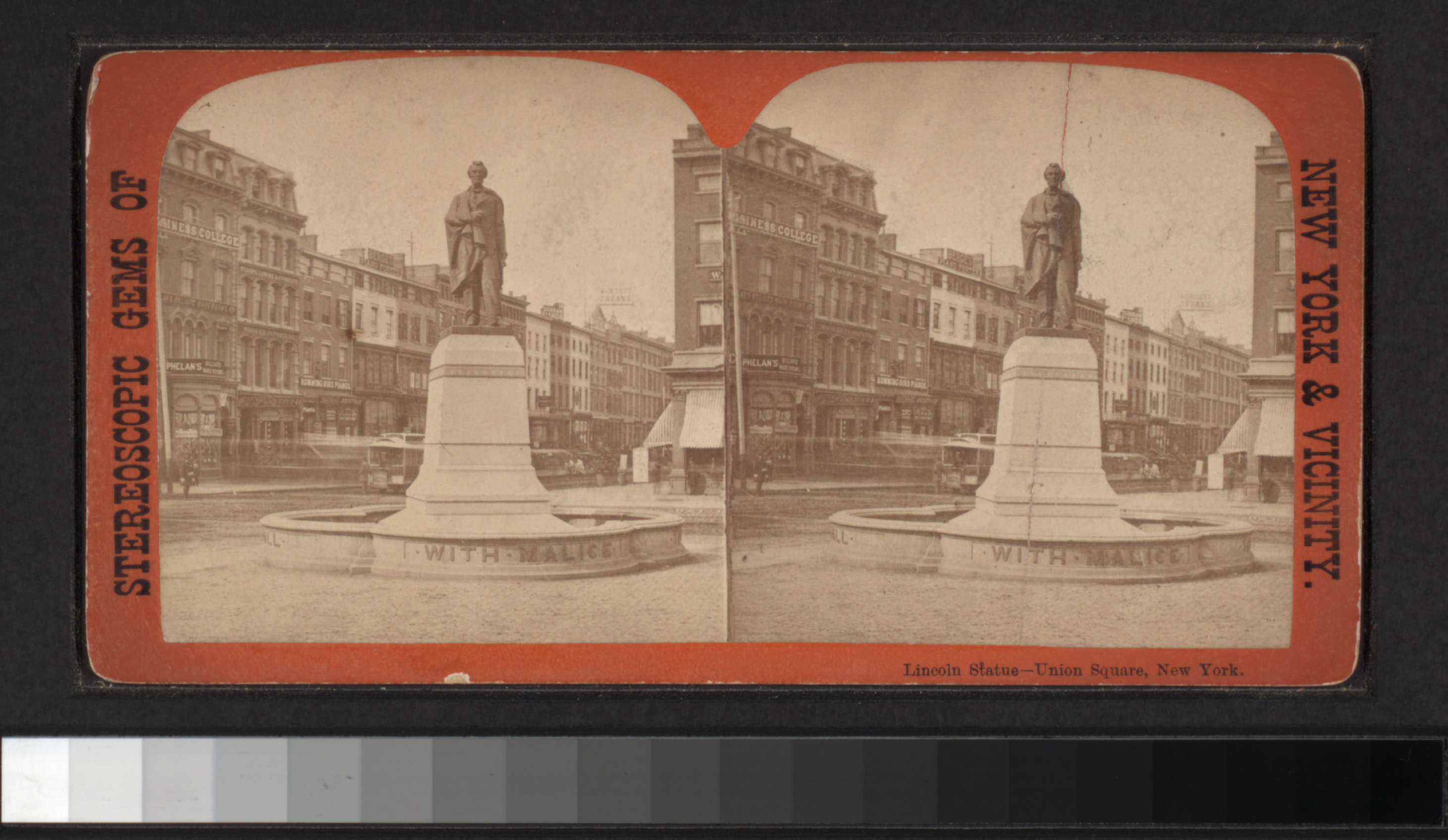
The statue with a view of 14th Street in the 1870s

Arrangements were made for the erection of the statue after the assassination of Abraham Lincoln in 1865. The statue was intended to be placed opposite to that of the equestrian statue of George Washington on the southwest corner of the square, which was also designed by Henry Kirke Brown and was a widely acclaimed statue. Although Brown studied sculpture in Italy like the majority of his contemporaries, he was still among those who were attempting to establish a distinctly American sculptural style. This can be noted in his sculpture of Lincoln, as he combines a classical pose with a naturalist depiction. Brown is also responsible for another portrait of Lincoln which is located in Prospect Park, Brooklyn, and was completed shortly before this one.

The Statue of Abraham Lincoln was cast in 1870 and dedicated on September 16 of that year, and the statue was originally installed at the southwest corner of Union Square, where the statue of Mahatma Gandhi now stands. According to a New York Times report of the unveiling, the crowd watched as the monument was assembled and the pedestal of the monument was formed from three large granite stones. The first, the largest stone ever quarried in America up to this point, weighed over seventeen tons, while the second weighed 16,000 and the third 8,000. The height of the pedestal was 24 feet and the statue itself nearly 11 feet tall. The Abraham Lincoln Statue was cast by the Wood Bronze Company located in Philadelphia, PA. The granite that makes up the pedestal is specified as gray granite, and was taken from Dix Island quarries.

From the moment of its unveiling, the statue has received copious amounts of criticism concerning Brown’s stylistic choices. An opinion piece was published in The New York Times a few days after its installation, on September 21, 1870, which criticized the attire that had been selected for Lincoln. It stated that “The mind has not conceived such a pair of pantaloons as that which the artist has put on this statue. To increase the beauty of their effect, the designer of the work has clapped a Roman toga over the upper part of the figure, thus combining the costume of the past and the present in a manner never yet dreamt of by caricaturists.”

In 1875, a stone and bronze rail fence was constructed around the statue of Lincoln; the fence included an inscription of text from his second inaugural address, "with malice toward none; charity toward all." During the 1930 redesign of Union Square Park, the statue was moved to its current location, but the fence remained. The statue is in axial alignment with the Independence Flagstaff and George Washington. It was conserved in 1992.

== See also ==
- 1870 in art
- List of statues of Abraham Lincoln
- List of sculptures of presidents of the United States
