= Yoni Alter =

Israeli–British artist and designer

- Born: 1980 or 1981 (age 45–46); Neve Monosson, Israel
- Education: Bezalel Academy of Arts and Design (BA, Visual Communications, 2006); London College of Communication (MA, 2007)
- Known for: Sculpture, print, graphic design, public art
- Movement: Pop art
- Website: yoniishappy.com

Yoni Alter is an Israeli–British artist and designer based in London, known for vibrantly coloured works that reduce architecture, cities and familiar imagery to bold silhouettes and geometric forms. He works across print, sculpture, painting, public installation and digital media, and has collaborated with Hermès, Karl Lagerfeld, Tate, London Live and the Fine Arts Museums of San Francisco, among others.

== Early life and education ==
Alter grew up in Neve Monosson, a community in the Tel Aviv metropolitan area, the youngest of four siblings. The Evening Standard has reported that his father is an architect and his grandfather was an engineer.

He studied Visual Communications at the Bezalel Academy of Arts and Design in Jerusalem, where his teachers included the graphic designer and Israel Prize laureate David Tartakover. During his third year at Bezalel he spent a student-exchange term at Middlesex University in London. He completed a BA at Bezalel in 2006 and returned to London in 2007 for an MA in Graphic Design at the London College of Communication (part of the University of the Arts London). From 2008 he worked as a creative at the advertising agency JWT in London, continuing his personal art practice in parallel before transitioning to full-time independent work.

== Work ==
Alter's work sits between graphic design and fine art, with what Creative Review described as "strong silhouettes, bold colouring and Pop Art iconography".

=== Shapes of Cities ===
Alter's best-known print series is Shapes of Cities, in which the signature buildings of a given metropolis are stacked in a single frame at accurate comparative scale and rendered in overlapping translucent colour. Designboom described the prints as "sharp, detailed and vibrant", and Alter's New York skyline image has been stocked by the MoMA Design Store.

=== Love Continuum ===
Love Continuum is a 7.5-metre (approximately 25-foot) looping typographic sculpture that reads as an abstract curve from most angles but resolves into the word "love" when seen from a specific viewpoint.

The sculpture was first exhibited in London at Duke of York Square in Chelsea, opposite the Saatchi Gallery, in summer 2024 as part of the Kensington + Chelsea Art Week public art trail. Colossal compared the work to Robert Indiana's LOVE and noted its focus on "connection and togetherness".

In February 2025 the sculpture made its United States debut in New York City. It was installed at University Place Plaza, between 13th and 14th Streets adjoining Union Square, on 20 February 2025, presented by the Union Square Partnership in collaboration with the New York City Department of Transportation Art Program and Artmax / Andrew Logan Projects. A smaller version was also shown in the ground-floor storefront window of 860 Broadway (the building that had once housed Andy Warhol's Factory).

=== City Lights ===
In 2021, Alter created City Lights for Wembley Park's Winterfest light trail: a digital artwork displayed across LED banners along Olympic Way and culminating on London's tallest LED Christmas tree, a 25-metre walk-through structure carrying 100,000 kinetic lights.

=== Pointillist Bird ===
For the 2022 Summer Lights festival at Canary Wharf, Alter presented Pointillist Bird, a three-metre suspended sculpture formed from 98 translucent coloured discs.

=== Collaborations ===
- Karl Lagerfeld — Alter was the guest artist on the brand's Spring 2018 capsule collection, producing pixelated and pointillist graphics of the designer and his cat, Choupette, applied to ready-to-wear and accessories.
- Hermès — Alter designed the double-sided silk scarf Drive Me Crazy (90 cm), depicting a motorcyclist's and a horse-coach driver's points of view, for Hermès' men's collection.
- Tate — Alter has produced a long-running merchandise range for Tate.
- London Live — Alter was the artist for the London Live television channel, designing the brand identity and the five 25-second idents used at its 31 March 2014 launch; his London-landmark graphics also appeared on double-decker buses and a 25-metre banner in Shoreditch.

== Publications ==
Alter is the author of the illustrated books:

- London: Cityscape Timeline. Prestel.
- New York: Cityscape Timeline. Prestel.
- Dot Art: Sticker Seurat. Prestel.
- Dot Art: Sticker Van Gogh. Prestel.

His pictogram skyline work was included in the anthology Visual Families: Graphic Storytelling in Design and Illustration (Gestalten, 2014).

== Selected exhibitions ==
- City, Kemistry Gallery, London, 27 March – 3 May 2014 (solo).
- Love Continuum, Kensington + Chelsea Art Week, Duke of York Square, London, summer 2024.
- Love Continuum, University Place Plaza, Union Square, New York, opened 20 February 2025.

== Recognition ==
Alter was one of the honoured artists at the Global Gift · Hainan Expo Selection Awards Ceremony and Design Gala, held in Haikou on 14 April 2026 as part of the sixth China International Consumer Products Expo.
