= Union Square, Manhattan =

Intersection and neighborhood in New York City

- Union Square
- U.S. National Register of Historic Places
- U.S. National Historic Landmark
- New York State Register of Historic Places
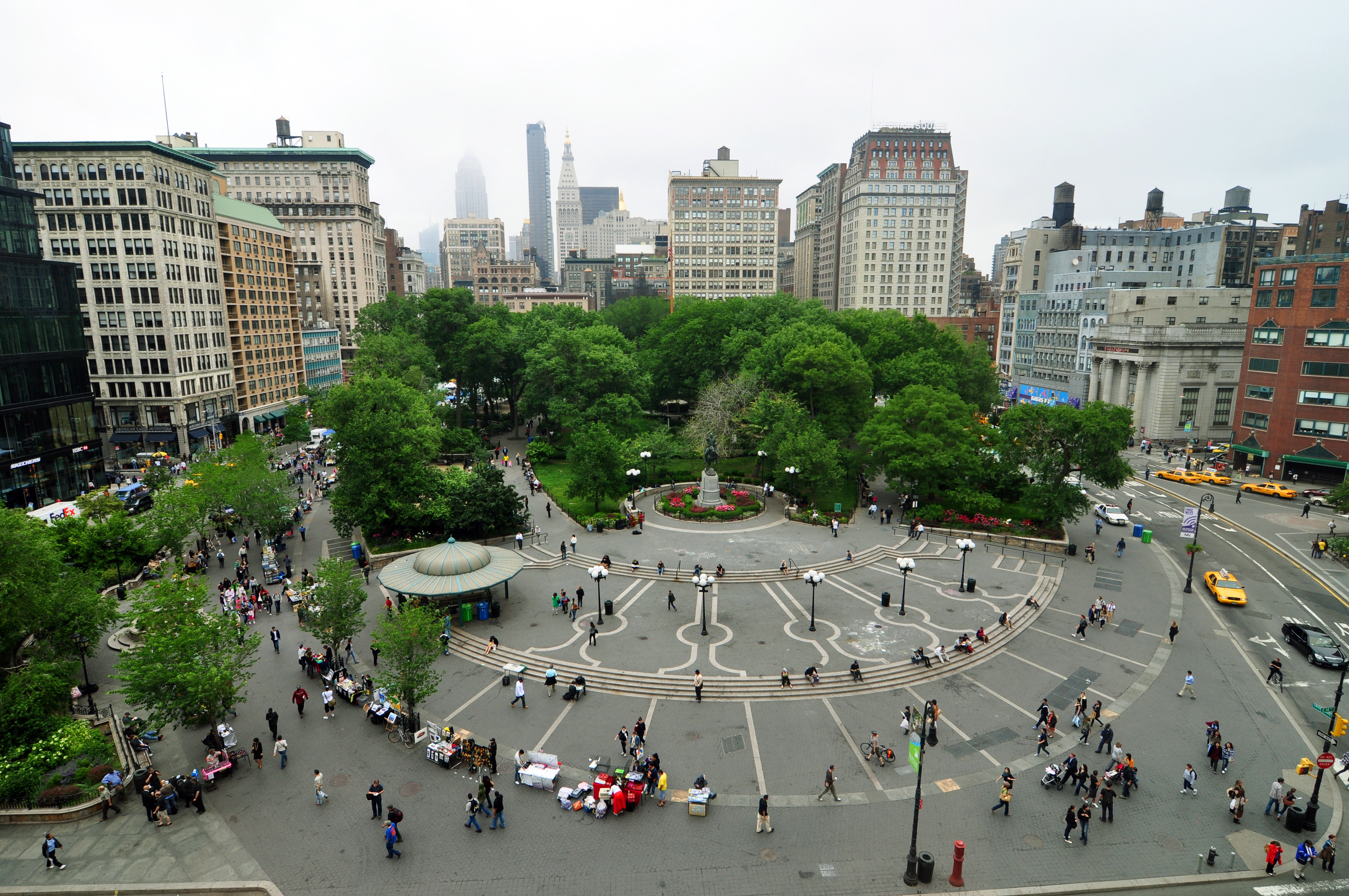
- Union Square seen from the south in May 2010
- Location: Manhattan, New York City, U.S.
- Coordinates: 40°44′08″N 73°59′26″W
- Built: 1882 (laid out c. 1832)
- Architects: Frédéric Auguste Bartholdi, et al.
- NRHP reference No.: 97001678
- NYSRHP No.: 06101.009534

Significant dates
- Added to NRHP: December 9, 1997
- Designated NHL: December 9, 1997
- Designated NYSRHP: December 9, 1997

Union Square is a historic intersection and surrounding neighborhood in Manhattan, New York City, United States, located where Broadway and the former Bowery Road – now Park Avenue north of the Square – came together in the early 19th century. Its name denotes that "here was the union of the two principal thoroughfares of the island". The current Union Square Park is bounded by 14th Street on the south, 17th Street on the north, and Union Square West and Union Square East to the west and east respectively. 17th Street links together Broadway and Park Avenue South on the north end of the park, while Union Square East connects Park Avenue South to Fourth Avenue and the continuation of Broadway on the park's south side. The park is maintained by the New York City Department of Parks and Recreation.

Adjacent neighborhoods are the Flatiron District to the north, Chelsea to the west, Greenwich Village to the southwest, East Village to the southeast, and Gramercy Park to the east. Many buildings of The New School are near the square, as are several dormitories of New York University. The eastern side of the square is dominated by the four Zeckendorf Towers, and the south side by the full-square-block mixed-use One Union Square South, which contains a wall sculpture and digital clock titled Metronome. Union Square Park also contains an assortment of art, including statues of George Washington, Marquis de Lafayette, Abraham Lincoln, and Mahatma Gandhi.

Union Square is part of Manhattan Community District 5 and its primary ZIP Code is 10003. It is patrolled by the 13th Precinct of the New York City Police Department. The New York City Subway's 14th Street–Union Square station, served by the 4, 5, 6, <6>, L, N, Q, R, and W trains, is located under Union Square.

== History ==
=== Development ===
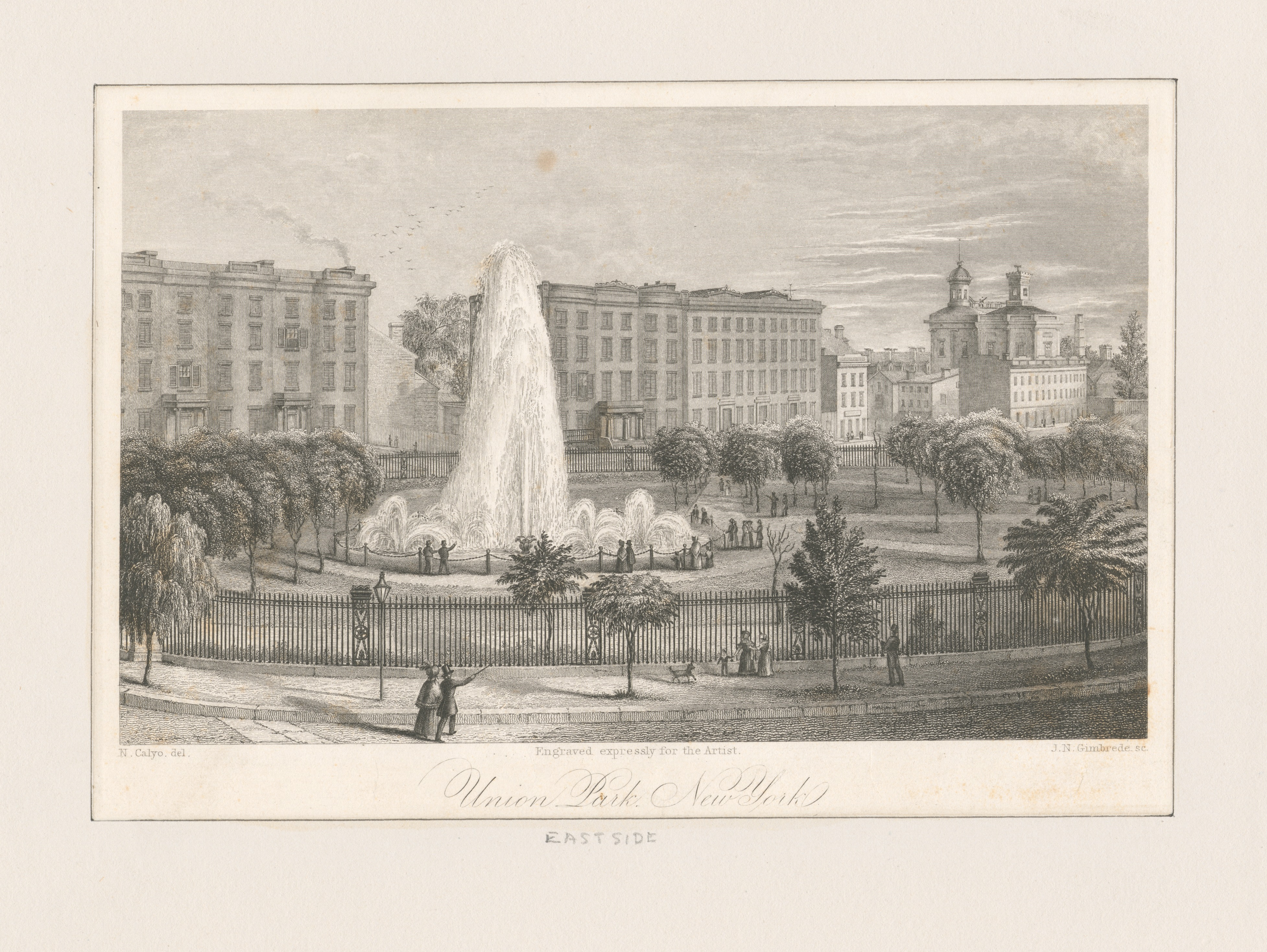
Union Park New York (East side), an 1892 illustration

Prior to the area's settlement, the area around present-day Union Square was farmland. The western part of the site was owned by Elias Brevoort, who later sold his land to John Smith in 1762; by 1788 it had been sold again to Henry Spingler (or Springler). On the eastern part of the land were farms owned by John Watts and Cornelius Williams. The northwestern corner of the park site contained 1 acre (0.40 ha) of land owned by the Manhattan Bank, which supposedly was a "refuge" for businesses during New York City's yellow fever epidemics.

When John Randel was surveying the island in preparation for the Commissioners' Plan of 1811, the Bloomingdale Road (now Broadway) angled away from the Bowery at an acute angle. Because it would have been difficult to develop buildings upon this angle, the Commissioners decided to form a square at the union. In 1815, by act of the state legislature, this former potter's field became a public commons for the city, at first named Union Place. Union Place originally was supposed to extend from 10th to 17th Streets. Several city officials objected that Union Place was too large and requested that it be "discontinued", and in 1814, the New York State Legislature acted to downsize the area by making 14th Street the southern boundary.

=== Mid-to-late 19th century ===
==== Residential neighborhood ====
In 1831, at a time when the city was quickly expanding and the surrounding area was still sparsely developed, Samuel Ruggles, one of the founders of the Bank of Commerce and the developer of Gramercy Park to the northeast, convinced the city to rename the area "Union Square". In doing so, Ruggles also got the city to enlarge the commons to 17th Street on the north and extend the axis of University Place to form the square's west side, thus turning the common from a triangular to a rectangular area. By 1832, the area had been renamed Union Square. Ruggles obtained a fifty-year lease on most of the surrounding lots from 15th to 19th Streets, where he built sidewalks and curbs. In 1834, he convinced the Board of Aldermen to enclose and grade the square, then sold most of his leases and in 1839 built a four-story house facing the east side of the Square. The park at Union Square was completed and opened in July 1839.

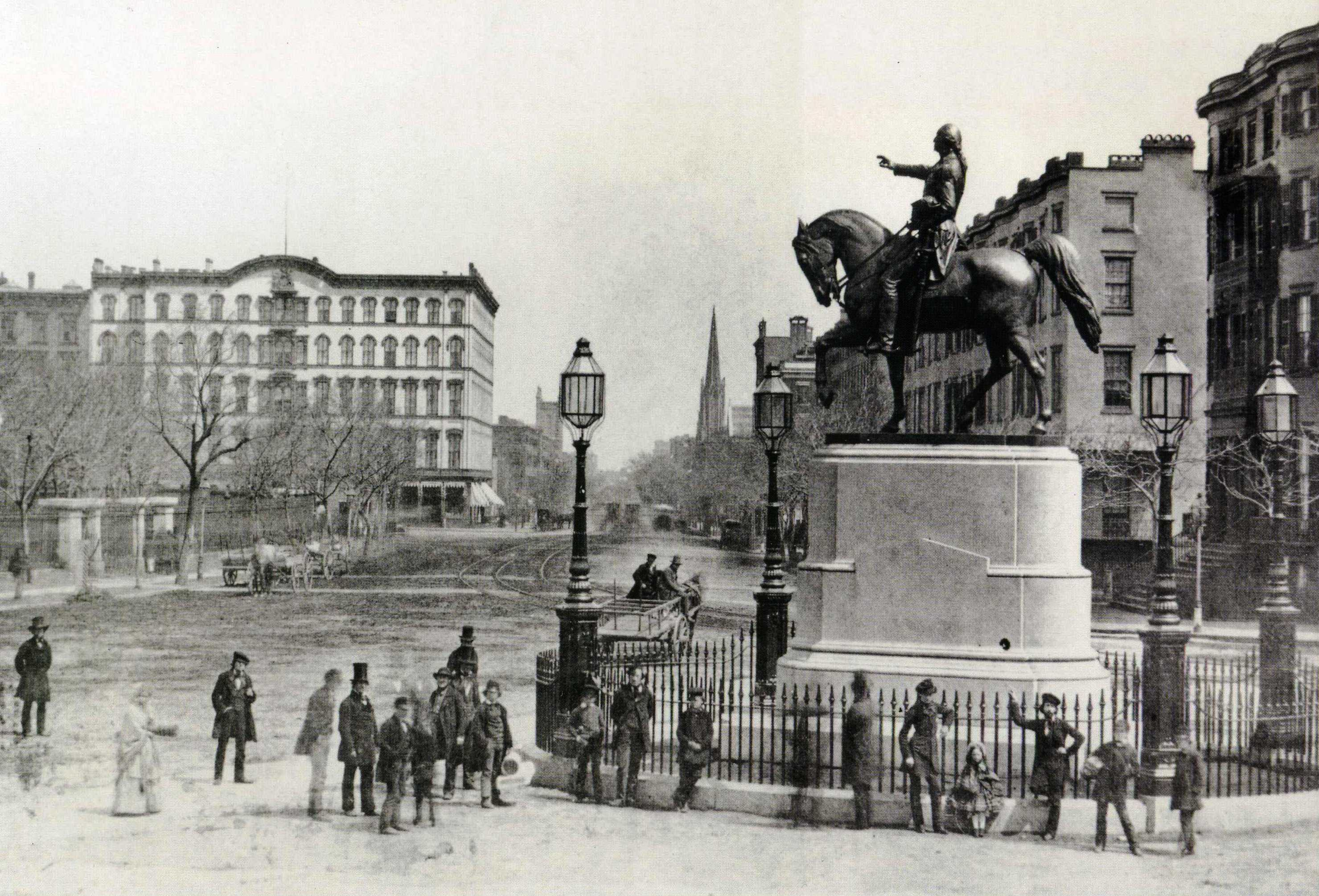
George Washington (Henry Kirke Brown, 1856) in the middle of Fourth Avenue at 14th Street, c.1870

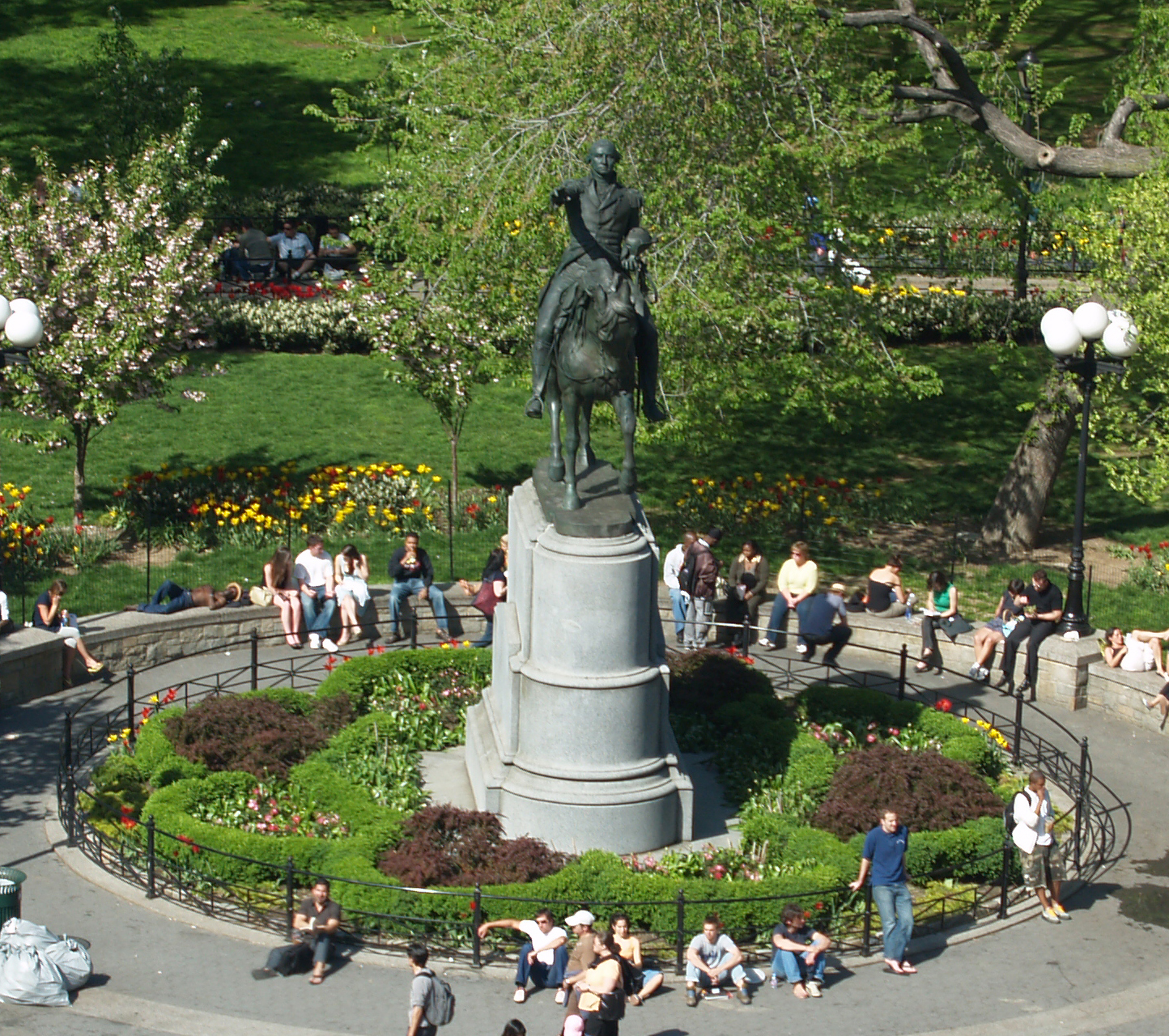
The statue in its current location in the middle of the park

A fountain was built in the center of Union Square to receive water from the Croton Aqueduct, completed in October 1842. In 1845, as the square finally began to fill with affluent houses, $116,000 was spent in paving the surrounding streets and planting the square, in part owing to the continued encouragement of Ruggles. The sole survivors of this early phase, though they have been much adapted and rebuilt, are a series of three- and four-story brick rowhouses, 862–866 Broadway, at the turn where Broadway exits the square at 17th Street. The Everett House on the corner of 17th Street and Fourth Avenue (built 1848, demolished 1908) was for decades one of the city's most fashionable hotels. In the early years of the park, a fence surrounded the square's central oval planted with radiating walks lined with trees. After the assassination of Abraham Lincoln in 1865, arrangements were made for the erection of the statue of Lincoln in the square. In 1872, Frederick Law Olmsted and Calvert Vaux were called in to replant the park, as an open glade with clumps of trees.

Initially, the square was largely residential: the Union League Club first occupied a house loaned for the purpose by Henry G. Marquand at the corner of 17th Street and Broadway. After the Civil War the neighborhood became largely commercial, and the square began to lose social cachet at the turn of the twentieth century, with many of the old mansions being demolished. Tiffany & Co., which had moved to the square from Broadway and Broome Street in 1870, left its premises on 15th Street to move uptown to 37th Street in 1905; the silversmiths Gorham Company moved up from 19th Street in 1906. The last of the neighborhood's free-standing private mansions, Peter Goelet's at the northeast corner of 19th Street, made way for a commercial building in 1897.

==== The Rialto ====
The Rialto, New York City's first commercial theater district, was located in and around Union Square beginning in the 1870s. It was named after Venice's Rialto, a commercial district. The first facility to open within the Union Square Rialto was the Academy of Music, which opened at Irving Place in 1854. The theater district gradually relocated northward, into less expensive and undeveloped uptown neighborhoods, and eventually into the current Theater District.

Before the Civil War, theatres in New York City were primarily located along Broadway and the Bowery up to 14th Street, with those on Broadway appealing more to the middle and upper classes and the Bowery theatres attracting immigrant audiences, clerks and the working class. After the war, the development of the Ladies' Mile shopping district along Fifth and Sixth Avenues above 14th Street had the effect of pulling the playhouses uptown, so that a "Rialto" theatrical strip came about on Broadway between 14th and 23rd Streets, between Union Square and Madison Square.

At the same time, a transition from stock companies, in which a resident acting company was based around a star or impresario, to a "combination" system, in which productions were put together on a one-time basis to mount a specific play, expanded the amount of outside support needed to service the theatrical industry. Thus, suppliers of props, costumes, wigs, scenery, and other theatrical necessities grew up around the new theatres. The new system also needed an organized way to engage actors for these one-off productions, so talent brokers and theatrical agents sprang up, as did theatrical boardinghouses, stage photographers, publicity agencies, theatrical printers and play publishers. Along with the hotels and restaurants which serviced the theatregoers and shoppers of the area, the Union Square Rialto was, by the end of the century, a thriving theatrical neighborhood, which would soon nonetheless migrate uptown to what became known as "Broadway" as the Rialto became subsumed into the more vice-oriented Tenderloin entertainment district.

=== Early 20th century ===
==== Office and wholesale district ====
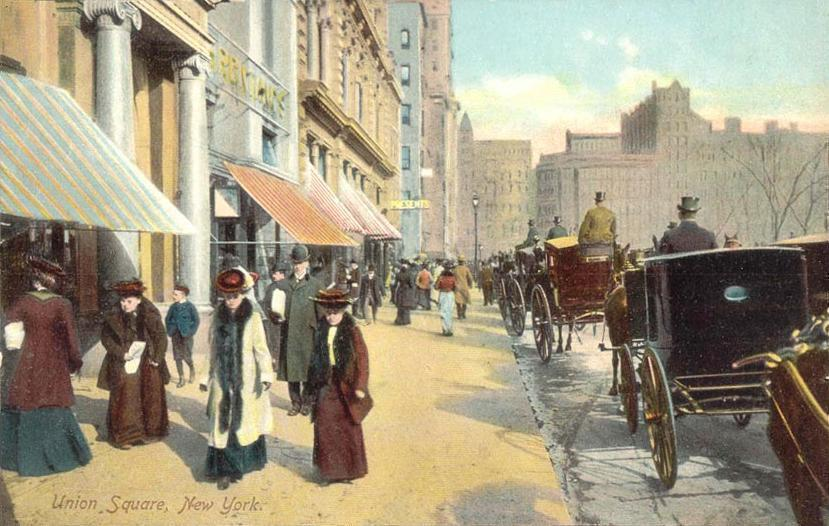
Union Square in 1908

By the first decade of the 20th century, Union Square had grown into a major transportation hub with several elevated and surface railroad lines running nearby, and the New York City Subway's 14th Street–Union Square station having opened in 1904. With the northward relocation of the theater district, Union Square also became a major wholesaling district with several loft buildings, as well as numerous office buildings. The office structures included the Everett Building, erected at the northwest corner of Park Avenue South and 17th Street in 1908; the Germania Life Insurance Company Building, erected at the northeast corner of the same intersection in 1910–1911; and the Consolidated Edison Building, constructed three blocks south at 14th Street between 1910 and 1914. Existing houses were also converted into stores, including a pair of merchants' houses on the east side of the park at 16th Street in 1916.

During this era, many of the older homes on Union Square were converted into tenements for immigrants and industrial workers. Numerous artists relocated into the attics of the remaining mansions along 14th Street, where they had their studios. The 1939 WPA Guide to New York City said that by the 1920s, the "south side of Fourteenth Street became virtually an ex-tension of Greenwich Village". Further, real estate values around Union Square had declined by the 1920s, with "burlesque houses, shooting galleries, and shoddy businesses" lining the square. Throughout the decade, most buildings on the eastern part of the square were purchased by department stores S. Klein and Ohrbach's. Real estate activity resumed in the late 1920s, and according to a 1928 piece in The New York Times, “several smaller operations are planned or are under way in the neighborhood". By then, at least eight banks had opened locations on the western and eastern sides of the park.

==== 1910s and 1920s renovation ====
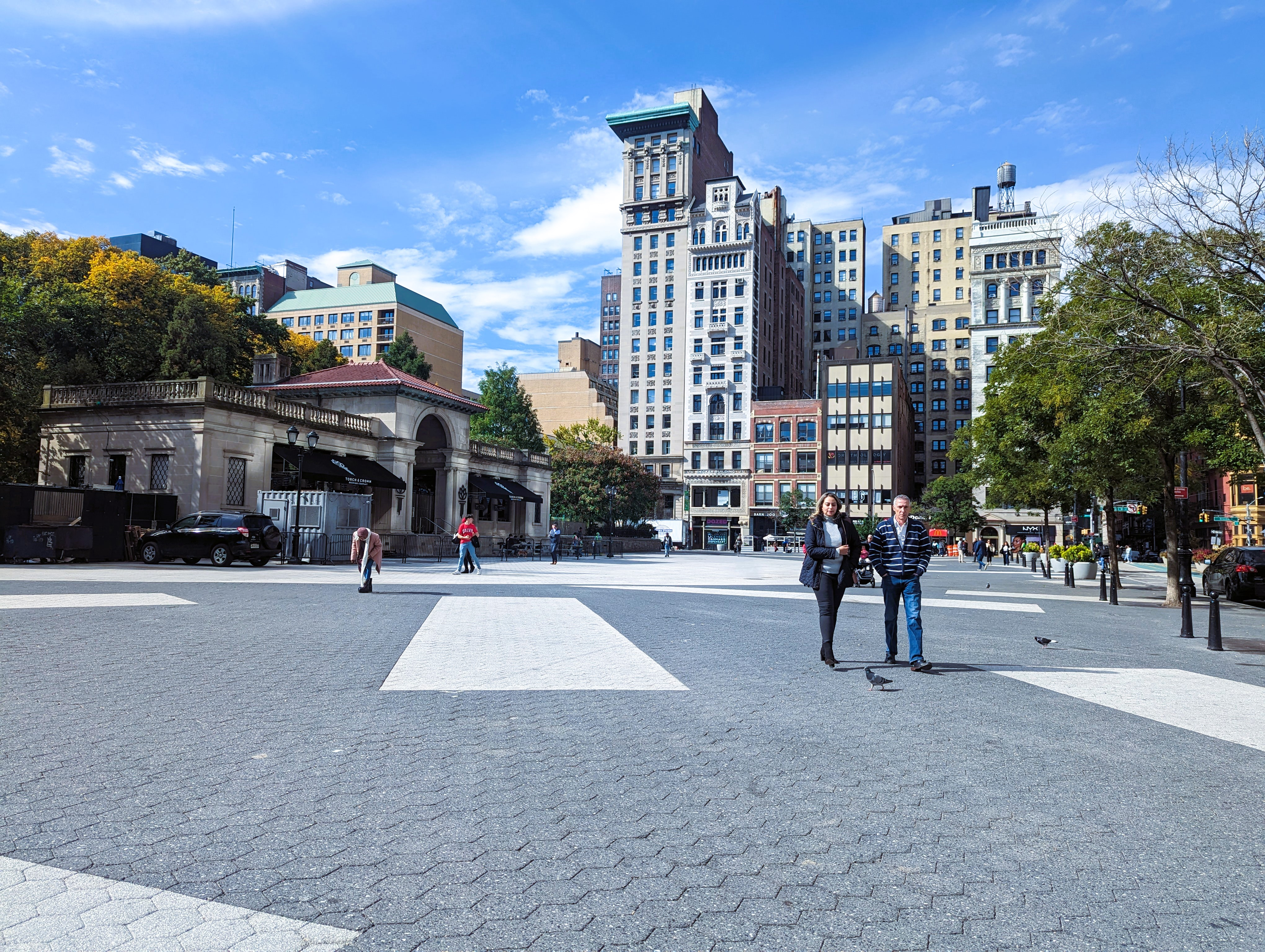
Pavilion at the north end of the park

City officials announced in 1910 that they would install a firefighters' memorial near the northern end of the park. The same year, there was a failed proposal to construct a courthouse within the park. As part of the Dual Contracts, workers began constructing the 14th Street–Union Square station, on the Brooklyn Rapid Transit Company's Broadway Line, under the park in 1913. The station was built using an open cut method, and a 120-foot-wide (37 m) strip of land, running diagonally through Union Square Park, was closed and excavated. By late 1913, large portions of Union Square Park had been demolished as part of the construction of the Broadway Line's Union Square station. New York City's parks commissioner promised members of the public that the park would be remodeled after the station was finished. The station had been completed by early 1916, and workers began restoring the section of Union Square Park above the 14th Street station.

The city's park commissioner Francis D. Gallatin proposed relocating the park's Washington, Lincoln, and Lafayette statues in 1922 to bring the Washington statue closer to the center of the park. A group of sculptors approved his proposal the same month. In 1927, the Municipal Art Society approved plans for a renovation of the park, which was to include a covered parking area at the north end of the park.

To make way for a further expansion of the Union Square subway station, the park was raised by about 3 feet (0.91 m) as part of a renovation during the late 1920s. The plans, announced in June 1929, also included relocating several statues and building a concert plaza with a bandstand at the park's northern end. There were also plans to relocate the Washington statue to Washington Square Park, although this proposal was opposed. Although the city decided to keep the Washington statue in Union Square Park, the statue was relocated to the southeast corner to make way for a flagpole honoring former Tammany Hall leader Charles F. Murphy. Landscaping of the park was delayed by the construction of the subway mezzanine below it. The park's renovation was nearly completed by mid-1931; the last construction contract, for the bandstand, was awarded that August. After building the bandstand, the New York City Department of Parks and Recreation could not afford to landscape the park. As a result, civic groups started landscaping the park for free in June 1932.

=== Late 20th century ===
Most of the neighborhood's largest retailers, such as Ohrbach's and Hearn's, had relocated by the 1950s, and the area began to decline. One of the last major retailers on Union Square, S. Klein, closed in 1975. The S. Klein site remained vacant until 1983, when William Zeckendorf leased the site for the Zeckendorf Towers development. The New York Times wrote at the time, "The former S. Klein store, boarded up since 1975, is a melancholy monument to a once-thriving commercial district."

In 1982, a $1.5 million refurbishment of Union Square Park was announced. At the time, the park was frequented by drug users because of its tall hedges, and many of the benches, lights, and statues had been vandalized. The first phase of the renovation, which cost $3.6 million, was completed in May 1985. The renovations included removing hedges, increasing lighting, and erecting new subway entrances. The renovation of Union Square, along with the construction of the Zeckendorf Towers, caused real-estate values in the area to increase. By 1987, there were plans to close off two blocks of the little-used Union Square West to make way for an expansion of the park. This plan was not carried out at the time due to a lack of funds. When the idea of closing Union Square West was again proposed in 1996, local business owners opposed the proposal because the park had become extremely popular, causing vehicular traffic in the neighborhood to increase significantly. Union Square was named a National Historic Landmark in 1997, primarily to honor it as the site of the first Labor Day parade. Mayor Rudy Giuliani announced plans in early 1998 to spend $2.6 million on expanding the park, following advocacy from area residents. The expansion consisted of a pocket park in a traffic island at the southeast corner of Union Square, which was completed in 2000.

=== 21st century ===
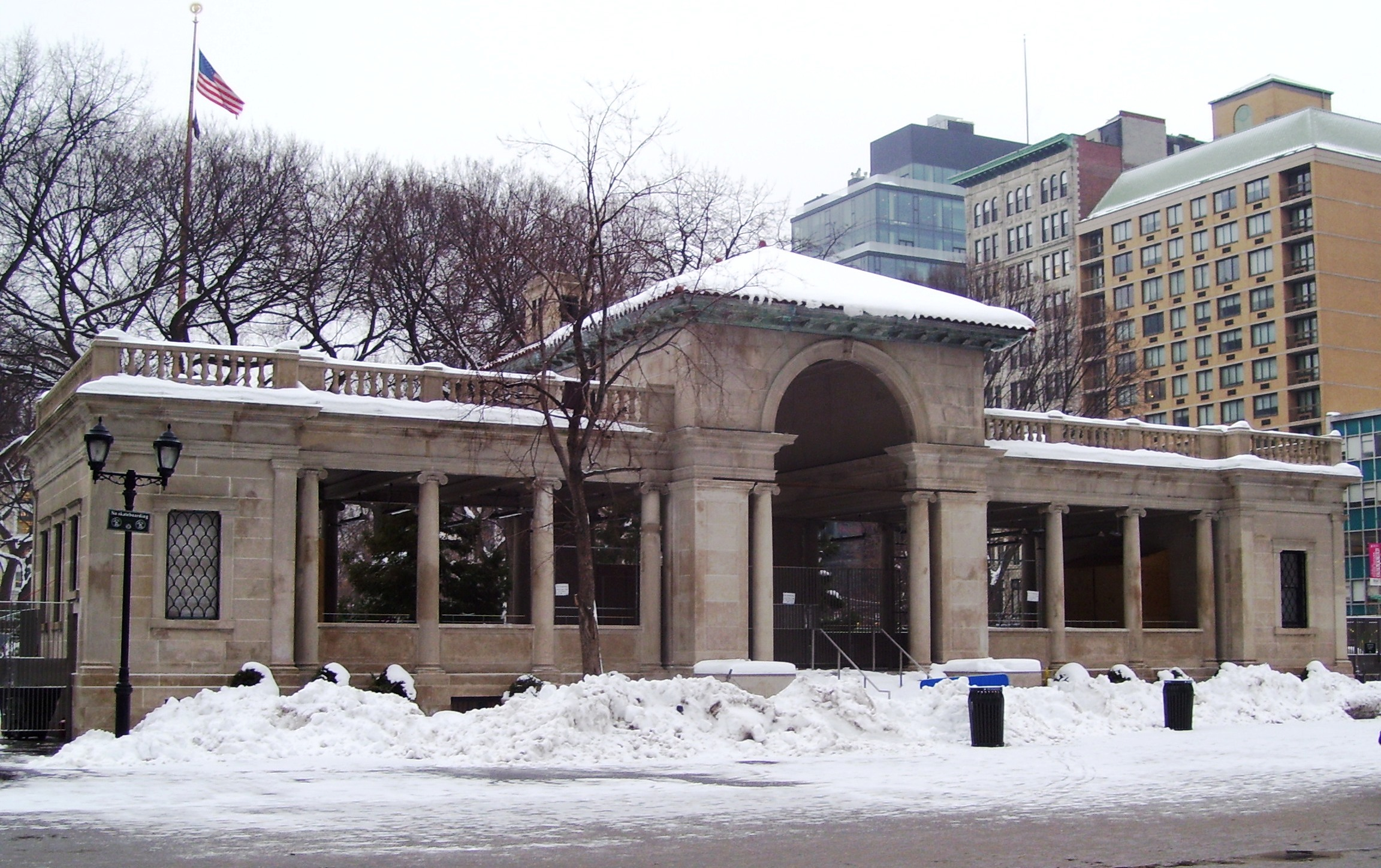
The renovated pavilion at the north end of the park in February 2011

Following the September 11 attacks in 2001, Union Square became a primary public gathering point for mourners. People created spontaneous candle and photograph memorials in the park and vigils were held to honor the victims. At the time, non-emergency vehicles were temporarily banned and pedestrian travel was restricted in Lower Manhattan below 14th Street.

In March 2008, an eighteen-month renovation began on the northern end of the park. The renovation was controversial because of disagreements over whether to place a restaurant in the pavilion at the north end of the park. A New York Supreme Court judge approved the renovation of the park's north end in April 2008 but placed an injunction temporarily banning the city from renovating the pavilion. In early 2009, a judge dismissed the lawsuit against the renovation, allowing a seasonal restaurant in the pavilion. CMS Architecture and Design was hired in 2011 to design the restaurant in the pavilion. The Pavilion restaurant opened in Union Square Park in May 2014, following years of disputes.

In 2021, the Union Square Partnership proposed spending $100 million to overhaul Union Square. The plan entailed closing off adjacent streets to increase the park's size by 33%, as well as adding benches and lighting, improving restrooms, and refurbishing a dog run in the park itself.

== Surrounding buildings ==
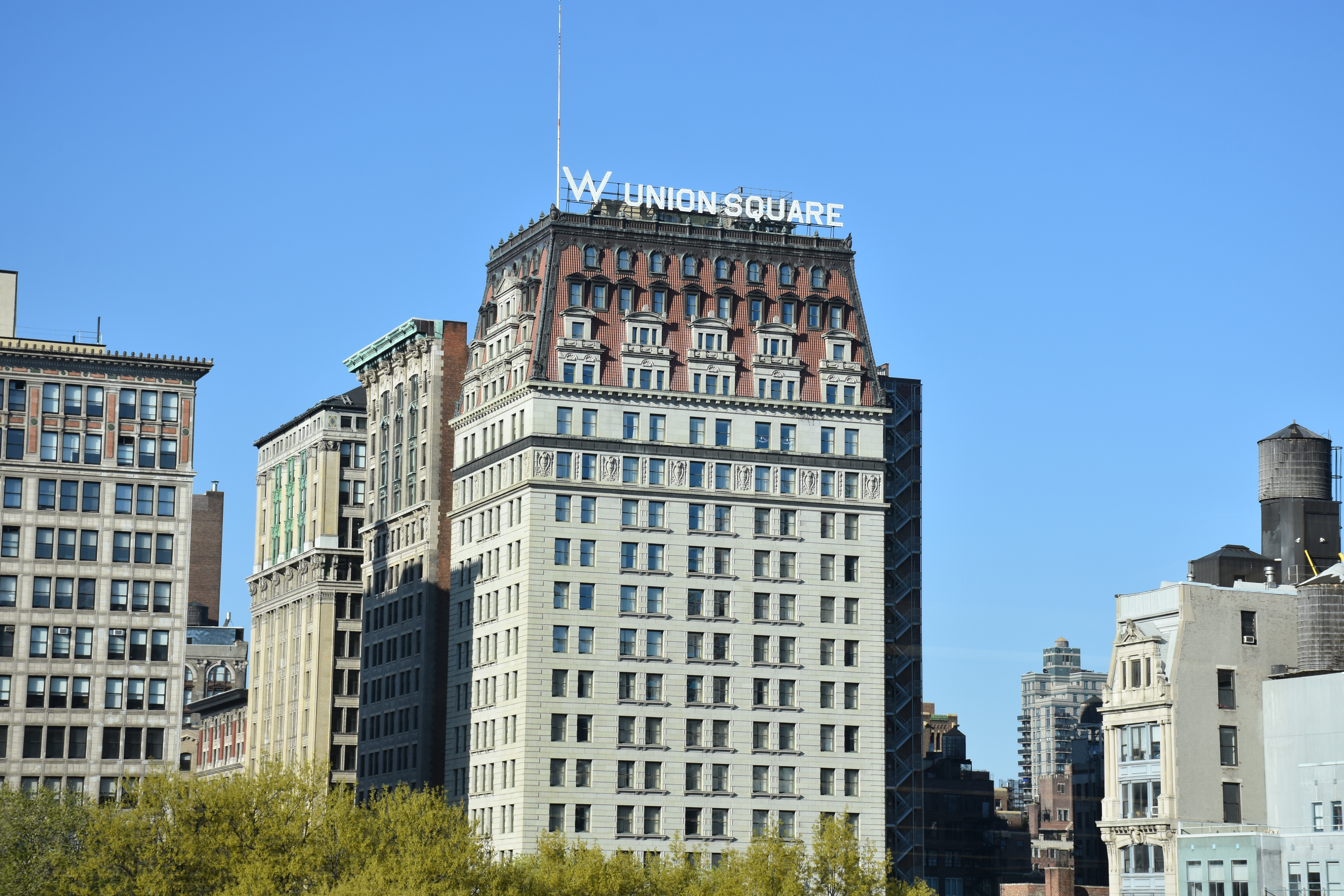
W New York Union Square with the Everett Building visible on the left

There are several notable buildings surrounding Union Square. Clockwise from southwest, they are:

- Lincoln Building at Union Square West and 14th Street, a city landmark that is also listed on the National Register of Historic Places (NRHP)
- Spingler Building (also Springler Building) at 5–9 Union Square West
- 15 Union Square West (former Tiffany & Co. Building)
- Bank of the Metropolis at 31 Union Square West, a city landmark and a NRHP listing
- Decker Building at 33 Union Square West, a city landmark and a NRHP listing
- Century Building (Barnes & Noble) at 33 East 17th Street, on the north side of Union Square, a city landmark and a NRHP listing
- Everett Building at 45 East 17th Street, on the north side of Union Square, a city landmark
- W New York Union Square (former Germania Life Insurance Company Building) at 50 Union Square East/105 East 17th Street, a city landmark and a NRHP listing
- 44 Union Square East (former Tammany Hall Building), a city landmark
- Daryl Roth Theatre (former Union Square Savings Bank) at 20 Union Square East, a city landmark
- Zeckendorf Towers at 1 Union Square East, a condominium complex on the former site of the bargain-priced department store S. Klein
- One Union Square South (Davis Brody Bond, 1999), features a kinetic wall sculpture and digital clock expelling bursts of steam, titled Metronome.

In addition, the Consolidated Edison Building is located one block east of the Zeckendorf Towers. The Century Association clubhouse is located on 15th Street between Irving Place and Union Square East.

== Art and sculpture ==
Mahatma Gandhi, a statue of Gandhi in Union Square

Union Square contains a large equestrian statue of U.S. President George Washington, modeled by Henry Kirke Brown and unveiled in 1856. Located at the south end of the park, it was the first public sculpture erected in New York City since the equestrian statue of George III in 1770, and the first American equestrian sculpture cast in bronze.

The Marquis de Lafayette, at Union Square East and 16th Street, was modeled by Frédéric Auguste Bartholdi and dedicated in 1876, the 100th anniversary of U.S. independence.

The statue of Abraham Lincoln, modeled by Henry Kirke Brown (1870), is located near the north end of the park.

A statue of Mahatma Gandhi in the southwest corner of the park was added in 1986.

The Union Square Drinking Fountain (1881) near Union Square West, also known as the James Fountain, is a Temperance fountain with the figure of Charity who empties her jug of water, aided by a child. It was donated by Daniel Willis James and sculpted by Adolf Donndorf.

The Charles F. Murphy Memorial Flagpole, also known as the Independence Flagstaff, was cast in 1926 and dedicated in 1930 to mark the 150th anniversary of U.S. independence. It is located in the center of the park.

In October 2023, an outdoor version of the sculpture N.Y.C. Legend by the Swedish artist Alexander Klingspor, featuring a New York sewer alligator, was unveiled in the square by Queen Silvia of Sweden.

A double line of trees is planted along 17th Street, and a corresponding plaque installed nearby, as a monument to victims of the Armenian genocide.

The park hosts rotating temporary public art installations through the NYC Parks "Art in the Parks" program, such as Fitzhugh Karol's Recess: Reads (2025–2026) and Yoni Alter's Love Continuum (2025–2026).

== Greenmarkets and businesses ==
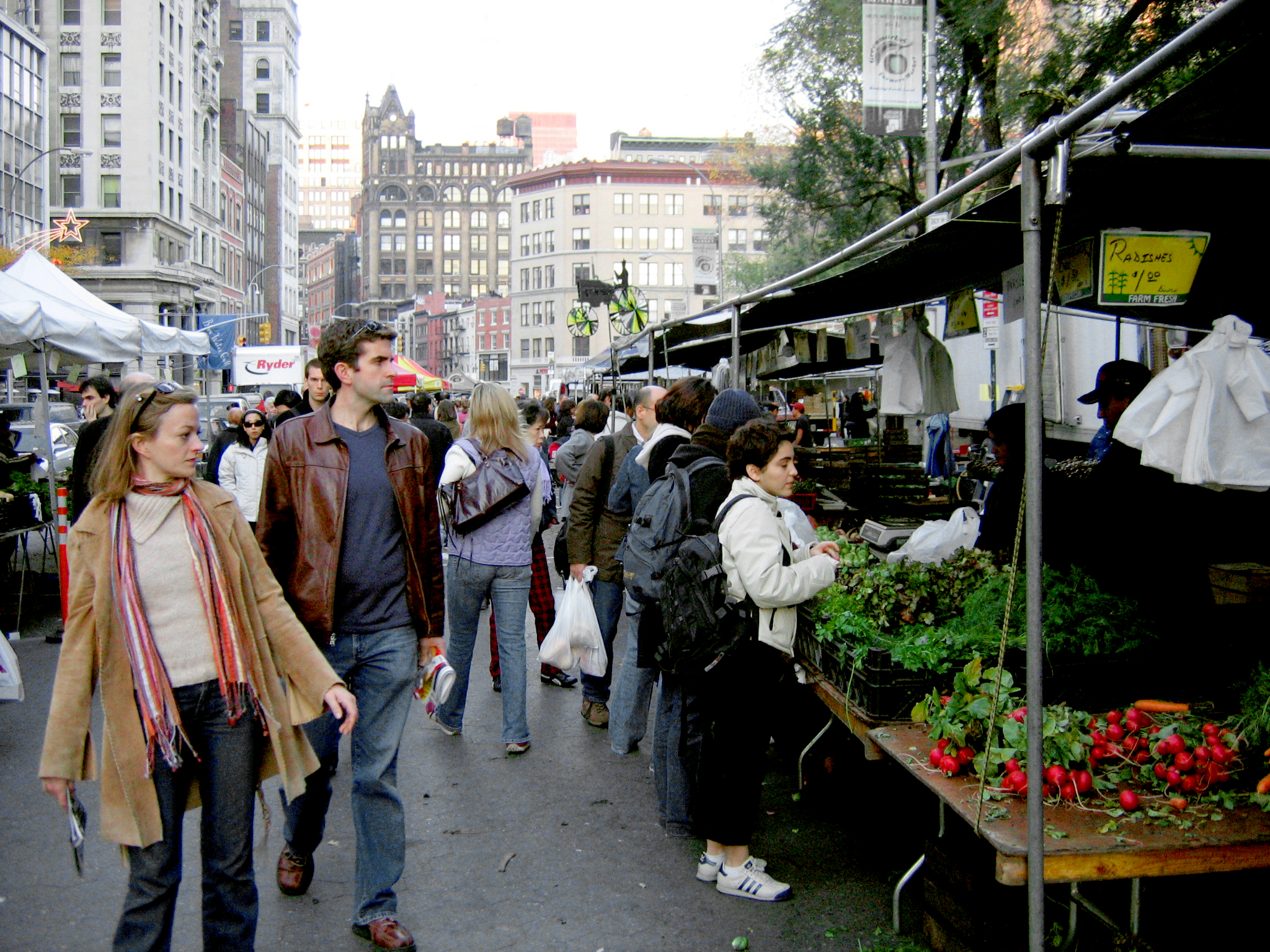
The outdoor Greenmarket Farmers Market, which is held four days a week

=== Public markets ===
In 1976, the Council on the Environment of New York City (now GrowNYC) established the Greenmarket program, which provided regional small-family farmers with opportunities to sell their fruits, vegetables and other farm products at open-air markets in the city. There were originally seven farmers at the first Greenmarket, and their selection sold out by noon. That summer, two more markets opened in New York City. Despite some backlash from local merchants and supermarkets who believed the Greenmarket was cutting into their profits, more markets opened in the city.

Today, the Union Square Greenmarket, the best known of the markets, is held year-round on Mondays, Wednesdays, Fridays, and Saturdays between 8 am and 6 pm. The market is served by a number of regional farmers, as the average distance between farmers and the market is 90 miles (140 km). During peak seasons, the Greenmarket serves more than 250,000 customers per week, who purchase more than one thousand varieties of fruits and vegetables can be found at the Greenmarket; and the variety of produce available is much broader than what is found in a conventional supermarket.

Union Square hosts the Union Square Holiday Market every November and December, in which more than 150 vendors sell handcrafts. Around two million people visit the Holiday Market annually. Starting in 2024, UrbanSpace also hosted the Night Market food market in Union Square during the summer.

=== Businesses ===
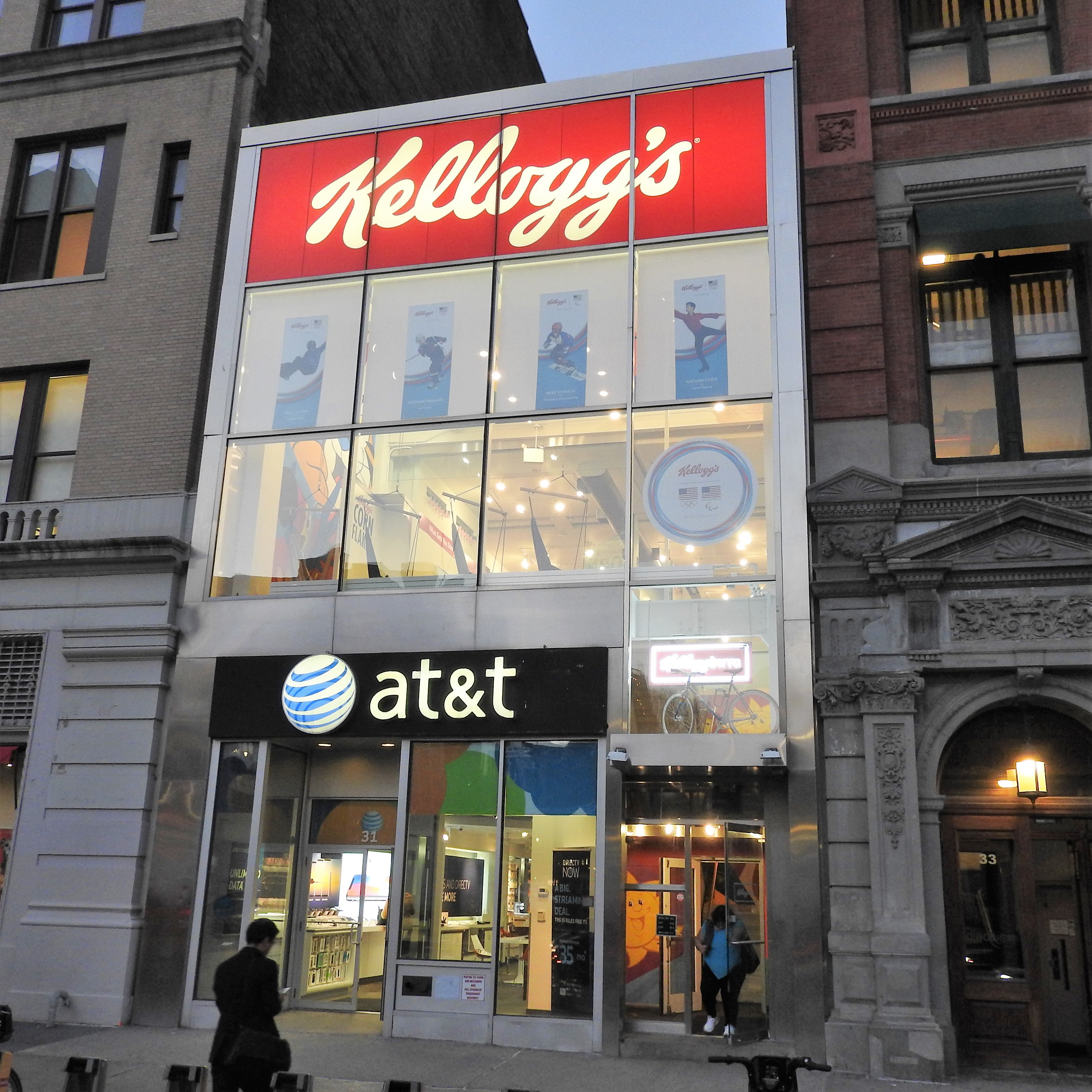
The former Kellogg's cafe at Union Square; the AT&T Wireless store is underneath it and next to the entrance.

Union Square is a popular meeting place, given its central location in Manhattan and its many nearby subway routes. There are many bars and restaurants on the periphery of the square, and the surrounding streets have some of the city's most renowned (and expensive) restaurants. S. Klein's department store promoted itself in the mid-20th century as an "On the Square" alternative to higher prices uptown, and late in the century several big-box chain stores established a presence, including Barnes & Noble in the Century Building, Babies "R" Us in the former United States Communist Party headquarters, and Staples in the Spingler Building.

The W New York Union Square, part of the W Hotels chain, is located at the park's northeast corner, in the former Guardian Life building. Additionally, the Hyatt Union Square New York hotel is located at the park's southeast corner, in a former post office.

== Cultural impact ==
=== Social and political activism ===
Along with nearby Washington Square Park, the park has historically been the start and/or end point for many political demonstrations. Although the park was known for its labor union rallies and the large 1861 gathering in support of Union troops, it was actually named for its location at the "union" of Bloomingdale Road (now Broadway) and the former Bowery Road decades before these gatherings. On April 20, 1861, soon after the fall of Fort Sumter, Major Robert Anderson, who was the commander of Fort Sumter brought the Fort Sumter Flag that flew at the fort to the park. The flag was flown from the George Washington statue, gathering patriotic rally of perhaps a quarter of a million people that is thought to have been the largest public gathering in North America up to that time. The flag was shortly removed after to be used as a patriotic fundraiser by being auctioned across the country repeatedly. In the summer of 1864 the north side of the square was the site of the Metropolitan Fair.

Union Square has been a frequent gathering point for radicals of all stripes to make speeches or demonstrate. In 1865, the recently formed Irish republican Fenian Brotherhood came out publicly and rented Dr. John Moffat's brownstone rowhouse at 32 East 17th Street, next to the Everett House hotel facing the north side of the square, for the capitol of the government-in-exile they declared. On September 5, 1882, in the first Labor Day celebration, a crowd of at least 10,000 workers paraded up Broadway and filed past the reviewing stand at Union Square. On March 28, 1908, an anarchist set off a bomb in Union Square which only killed himself and another man.

In 1893, Emma Goldman took the stage at Union Square to make her "Free Bread" speech to a crowd of overworked garment workers. She also addressed a crowd in 1916 on the need for free access to birth control, which was banned by the Comstock laws. Her visits to Union Square pulled hundreds of followers; some of these rallies resulted in her arrest.

Union Square has been used as a platform to raise awareness about the Black Lives Matter movement, such as during the George Floyd protests in New York City in 2020.

The Square's shopping district saw strikes in the S. Klein and Ohrbach department stores in 1934. White collar workers were among the worst paid in Great Depression-era New York City, with union memberships being highly discouraged by store managers and often seen as fireable offenses. These strikes often involved acts of disobedience by the workers as many of them did not want to lose their jobs. This period saw Union Square as a gathering point for many of the city's socialist and communist groups. The centennial of Union Square was seen as a thinly veiled effort to displace those elements with its draping of the square with flags and police demonstrations of anti protester drills.

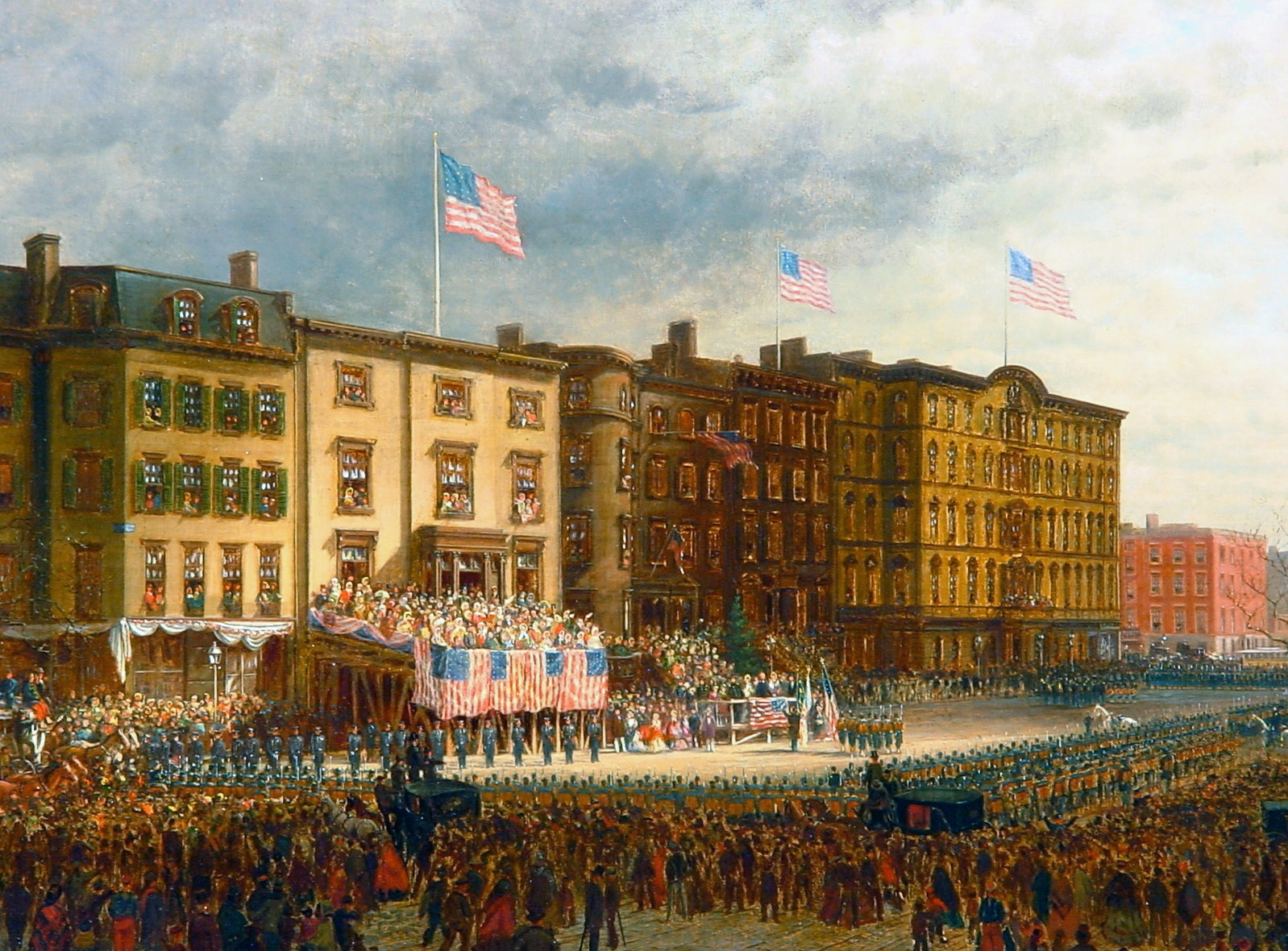
A patriotic demonstration: Presentation of colors before the Union League Club, 1864, by Edward Lamson Henry

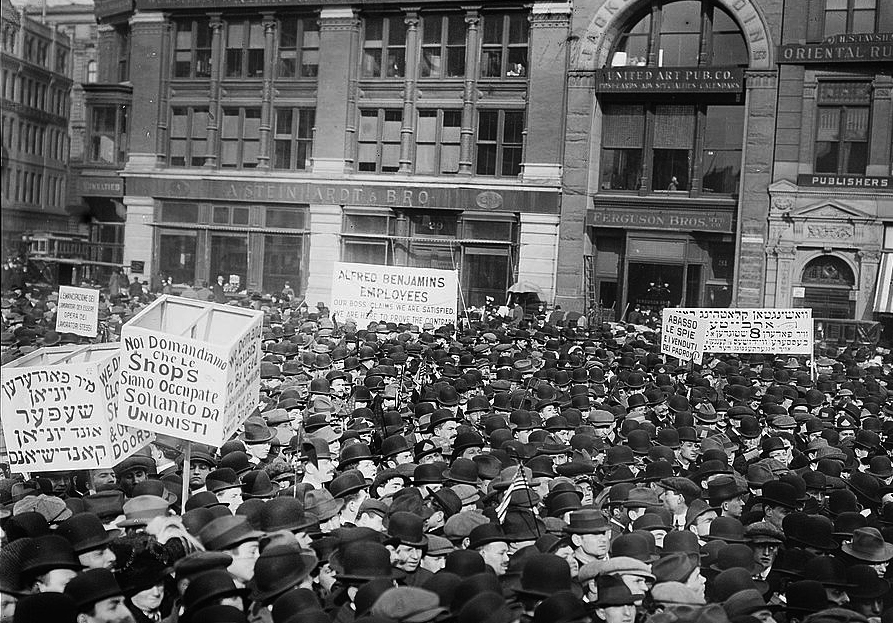
May Day 1913, strikers and protesters rally in Union Square, with signs in Yiddish, Italian and English

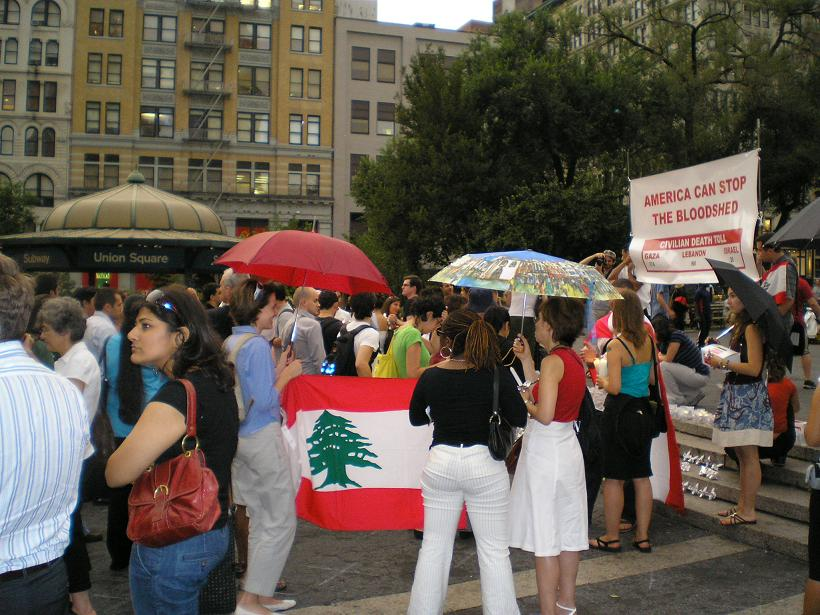
2006 Union Square protest

=== Street chess ===
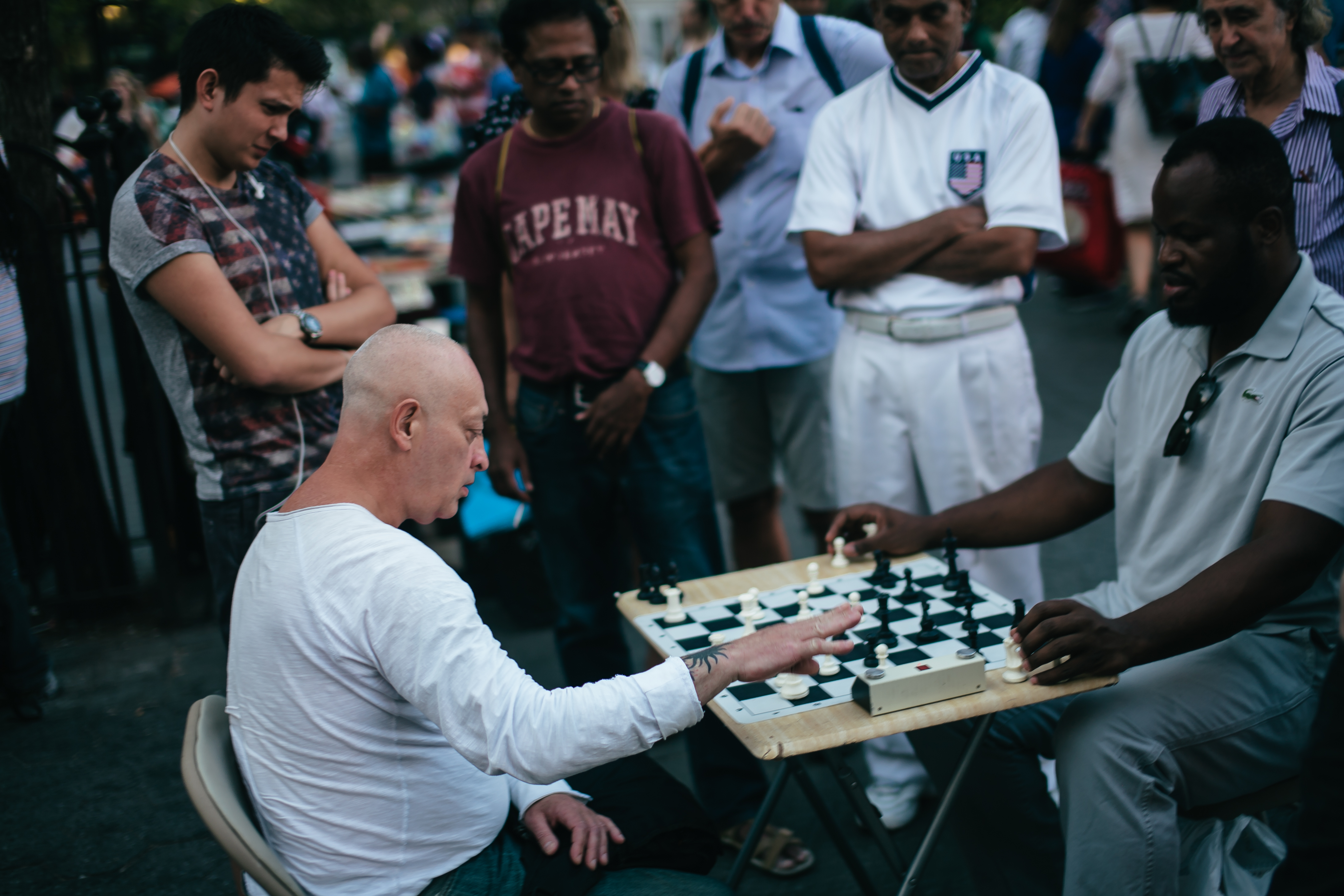
Spectators watch as a street chess player plays bullet chess with a customer in Union Square

The Villager, a local newspaper, reported in 2013 that most of the street chess players at Washington Square Park—where Bobby Fischer had played—had moved their games to Union Square because the latter had more foot traffic. Street chess players play fast chess with passers-by for three to five dollars a game, with time controls of five minutes on each side being the most common. Writer Lauren Snetiker at the Greenwich Village Society for Historic Preservation also documents this migration of the historical Washington Square Park chess scene to Union Square, noting the "dozens of chess players [who] sit on crates and bring their own boards... as there are no permanent ones like there are in Washington Square Park".

=== Freestyle hip-hop ===
Union Square is the site of a regular hip-hop freestyle rap cypher called Legendary Cyphers since 2012. The events draw residents from across the city and tourists and encourage participation in freestyle hip-hop. Notable local hip-hop artists such as Joey Bada$$ have attended in the past.

== Union Square Partnership ==
The Union Square Partnership (USP), a business improvement district (BID) and a local development corporation (LDC), was formed in 1984 and became a model for other BIDs in New York City. Jennifer E. Falk became its executive director in January 2007.

The Union Square Partnership provides a free public Wi-Fi network in Union Square.

== Education ==
The Washington Irving Campus at 40 Irving Place between East 16th and 17th Streets, a block east of Union Square Park, was formerly the location of a comprehensive high school, but now houses Gramercy Arts High School, the High School for Language and Diplomacy, the International High School at Union Square, the Union Square Academy for Health Sciences and the Academy for Software Engineering. In 2012, Success Academy Charter Schools announced its plan to open an elementary school in the building, and an elementary school opened there the next year.

== Gallery ==
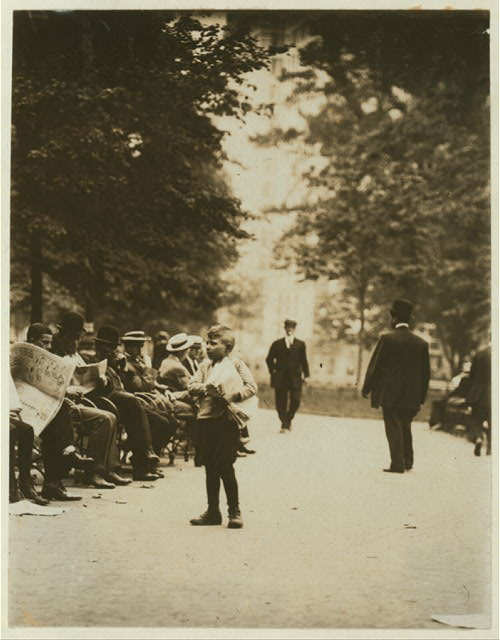
A boy selling newspapers in Union Square in July 1910

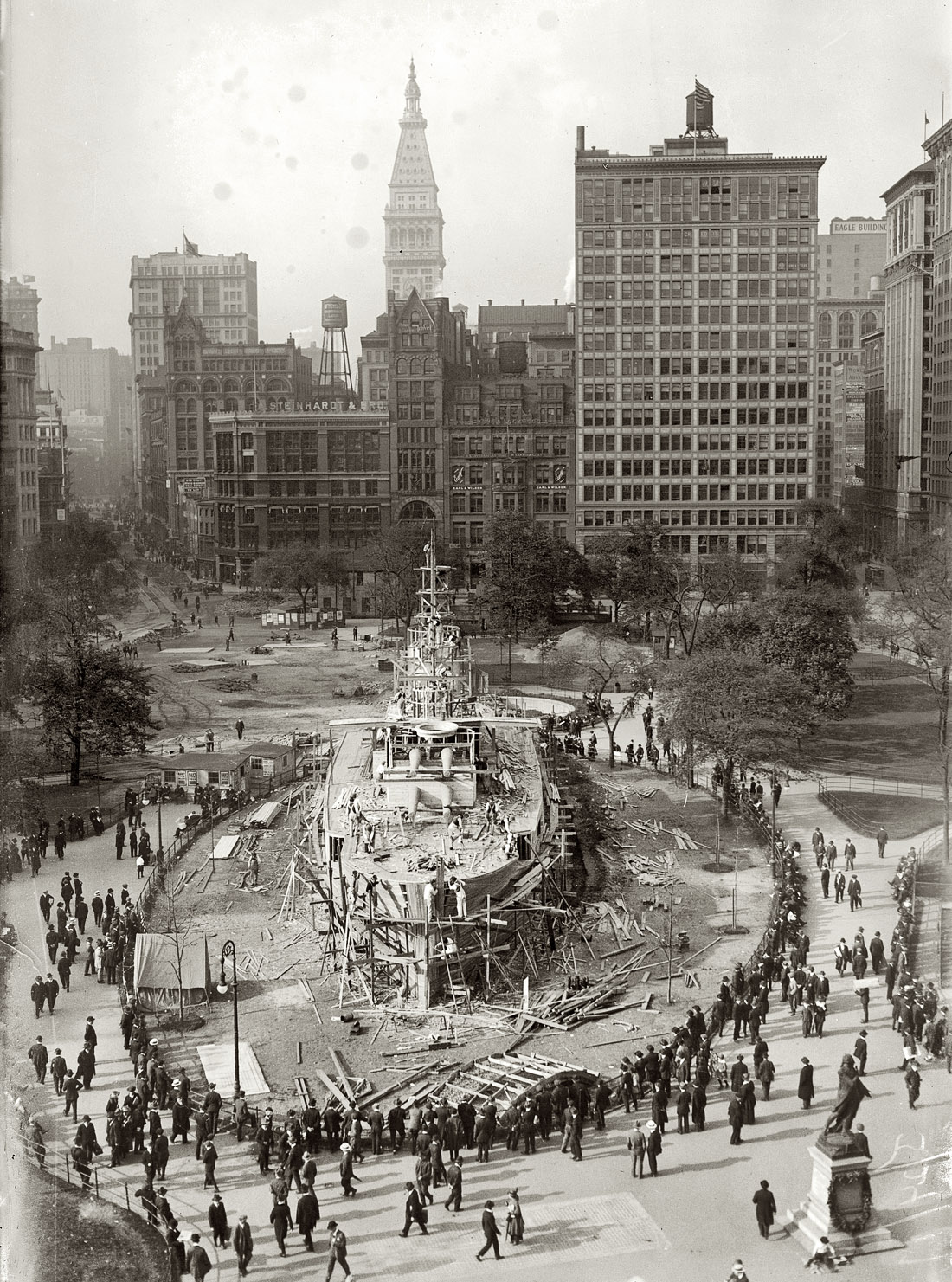
The Landship USS Recruit under construction in Union Square in 1917.

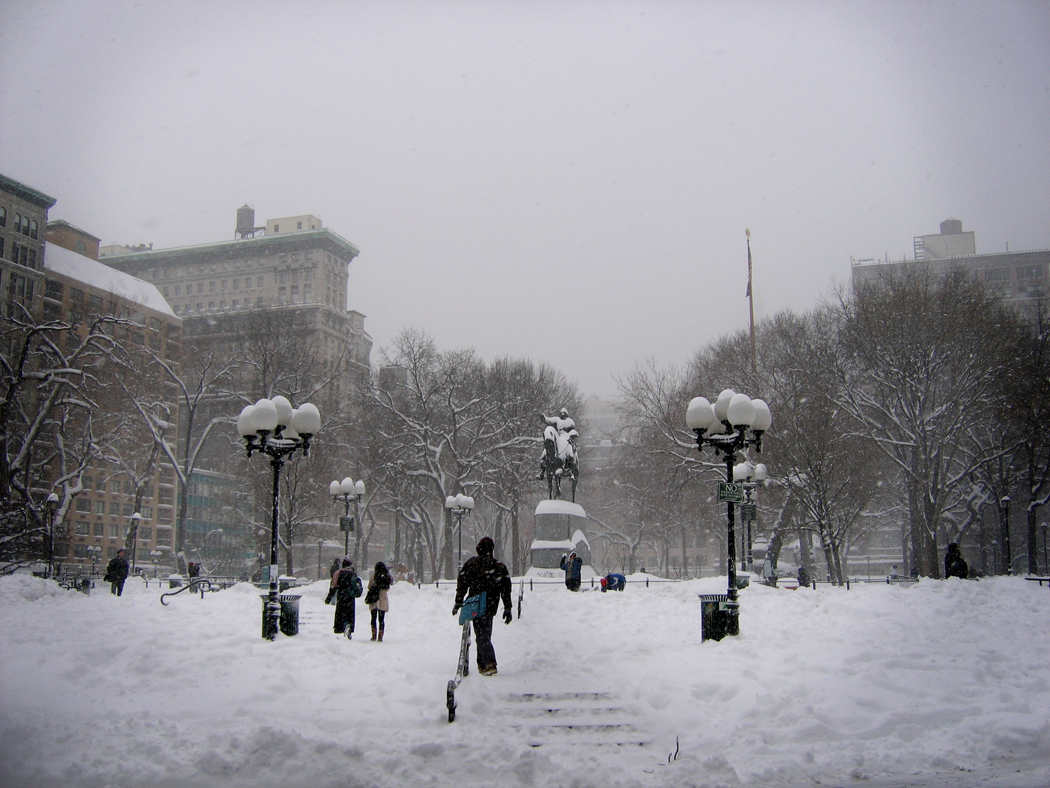
The square in the blizzard of 2006

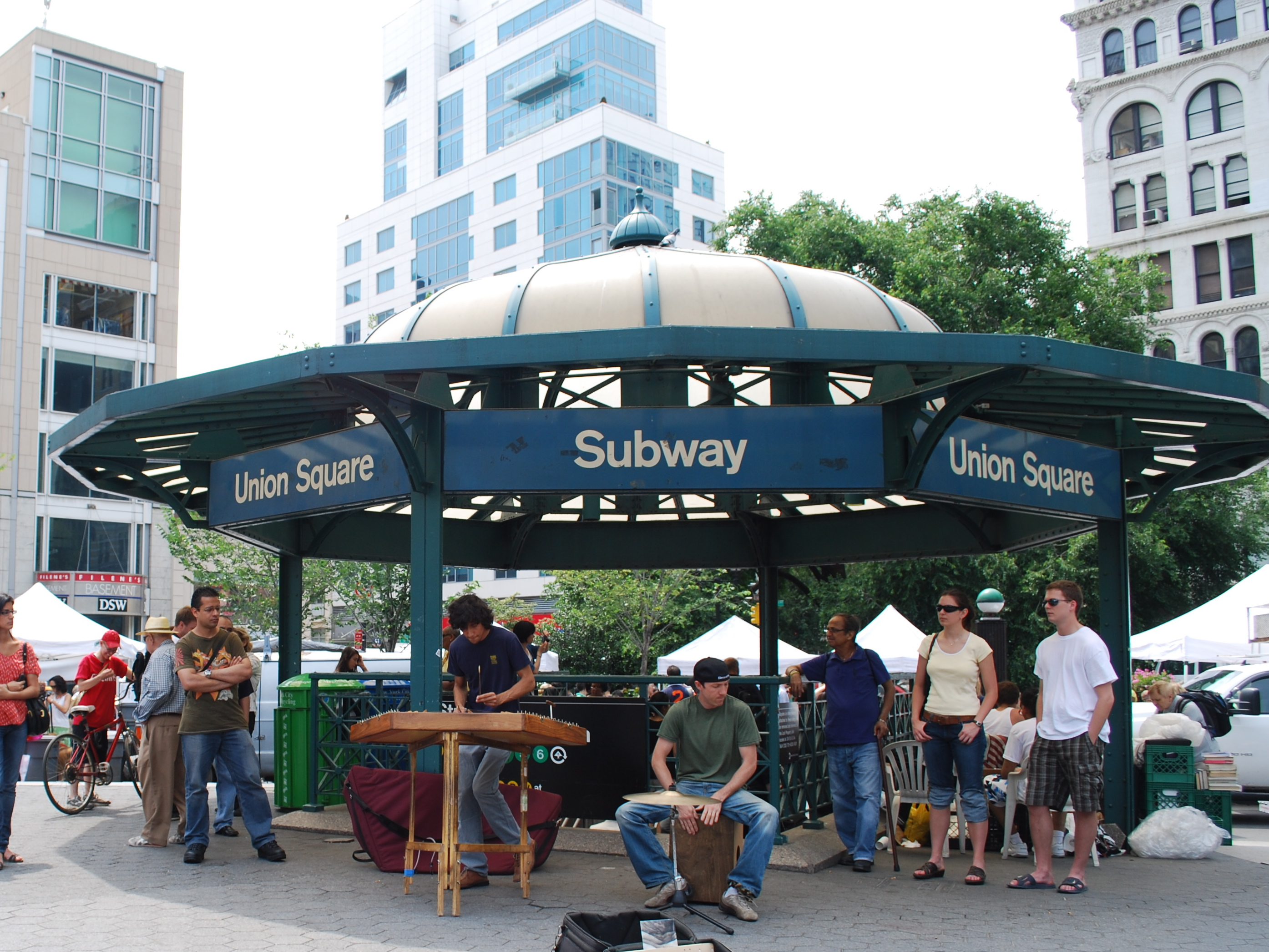
14th Street–Union Square station entrance

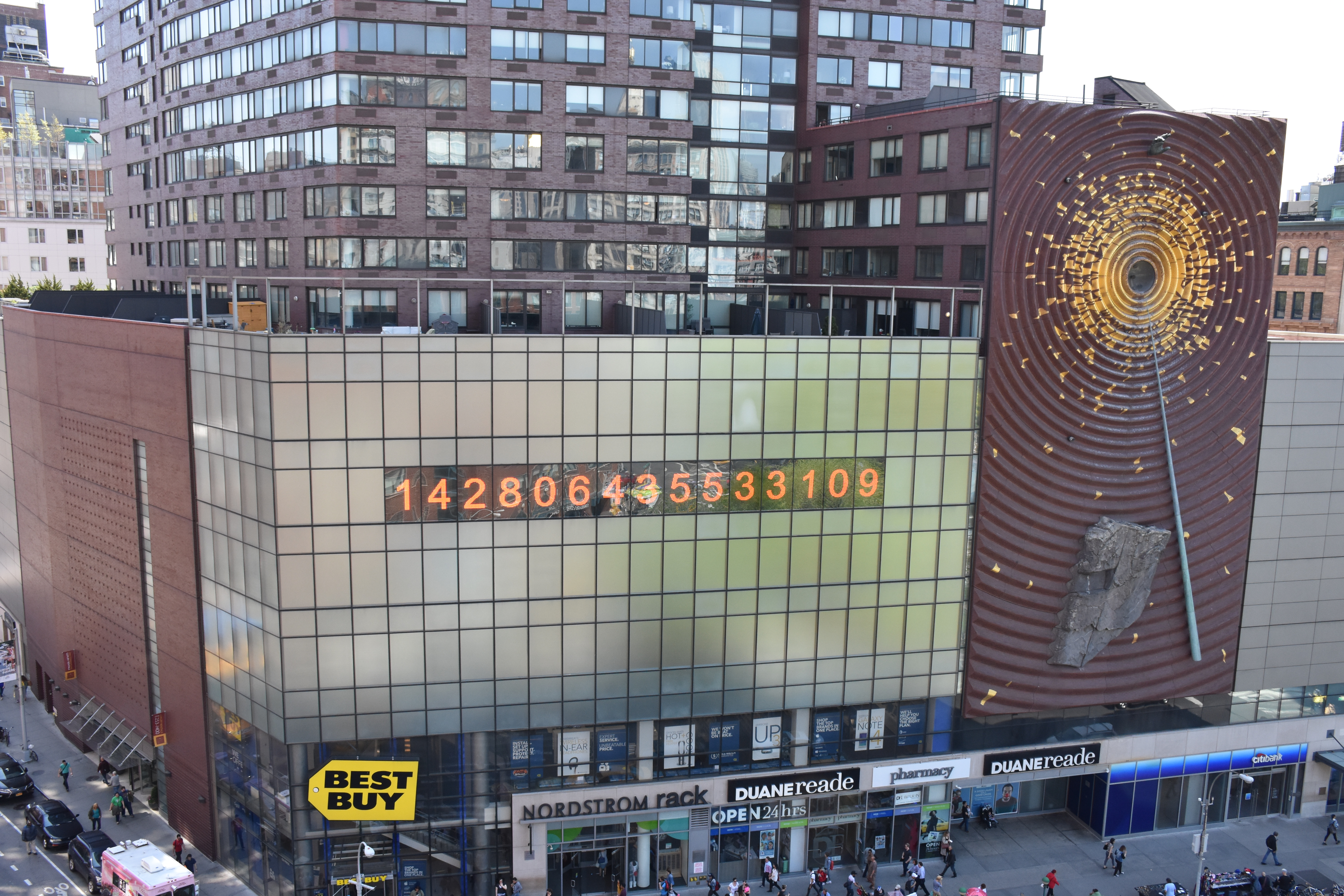
Metronome by Kristin Jones/Andrew Ginzel in 1999

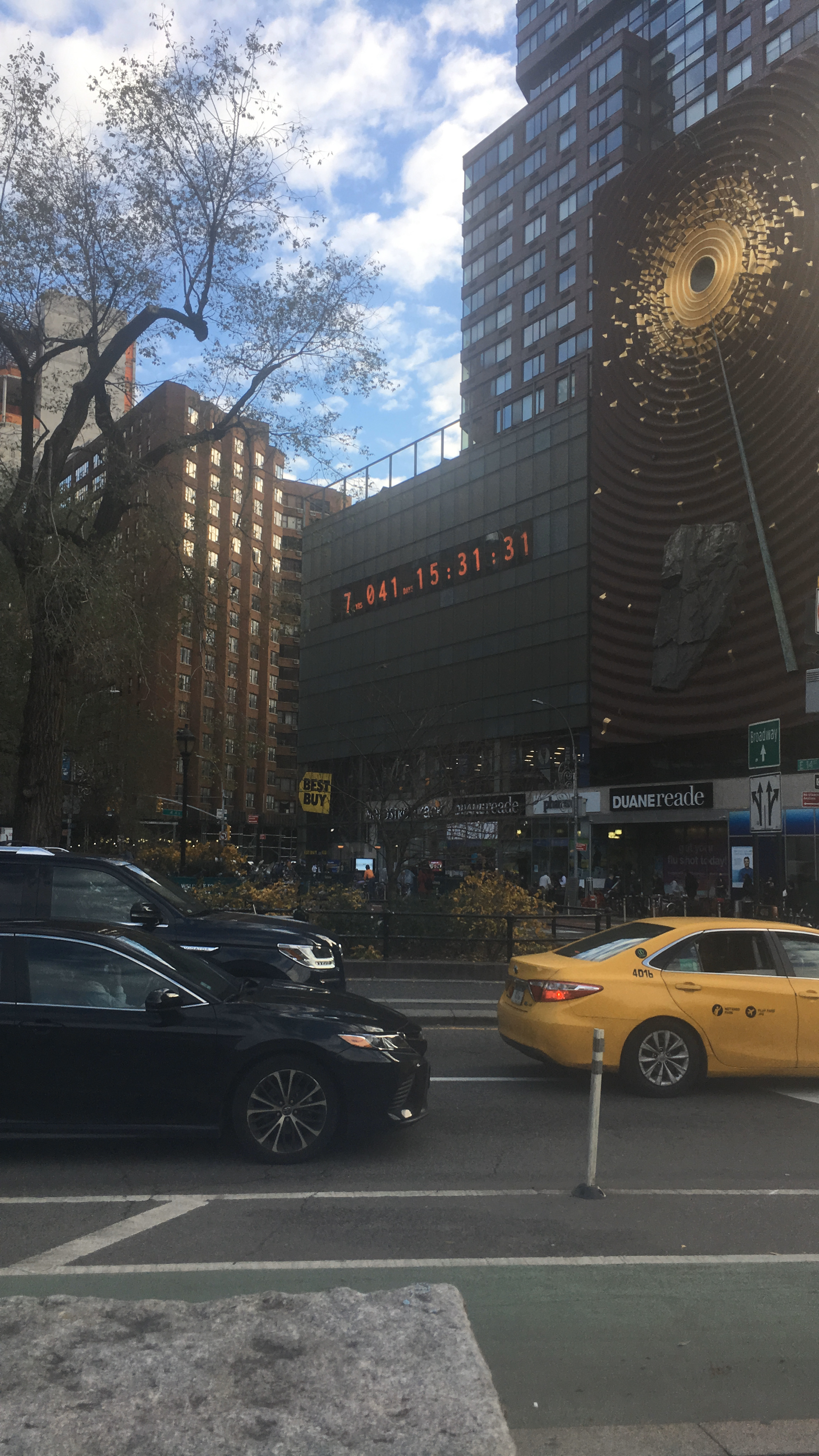
Metronome revision by Andrew Boyd and Gan Golan in 2020

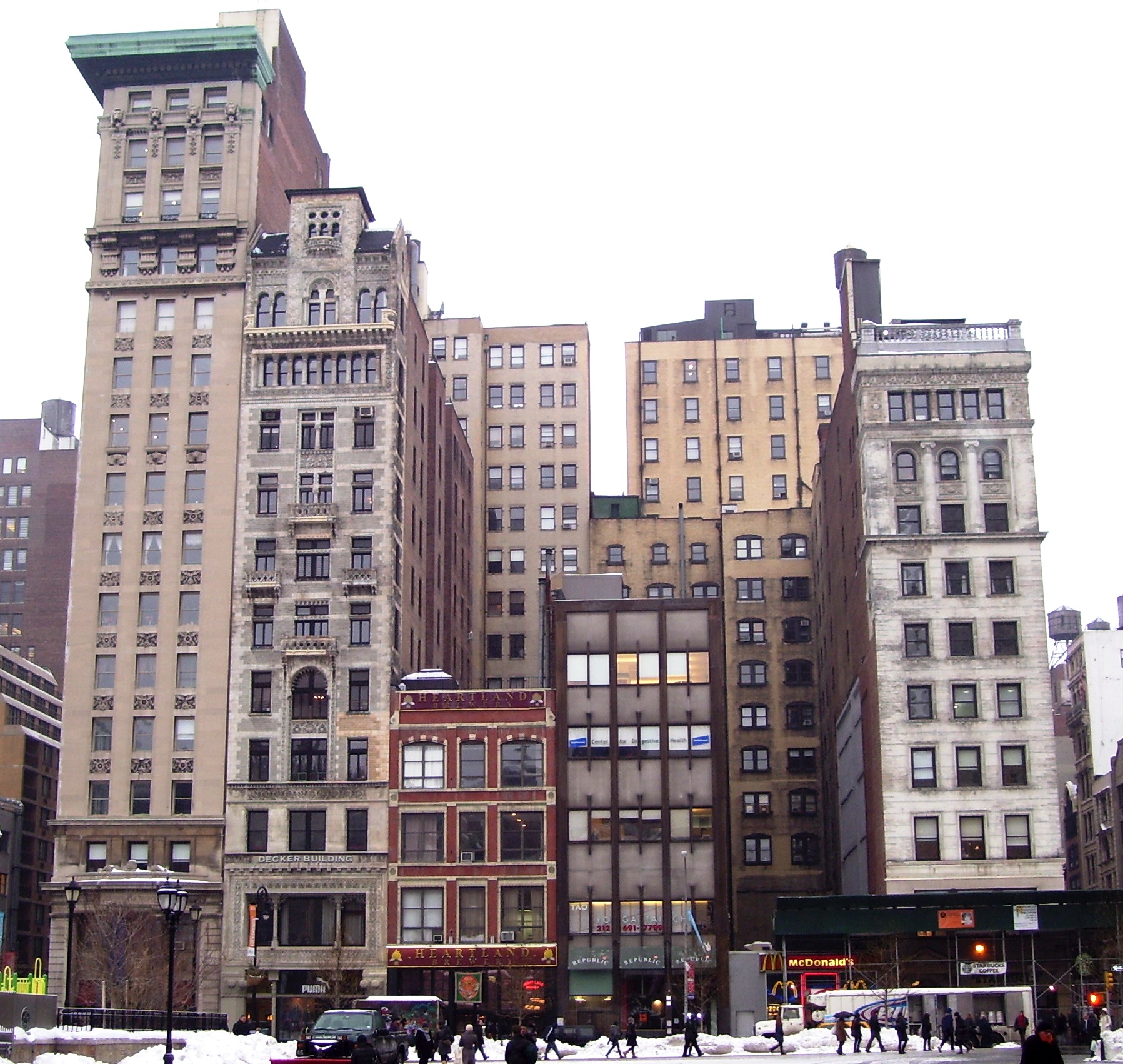
Union Square West, including the Bank of the Metropolis Building and Decker Building (on the left at the end of the block) in 2011

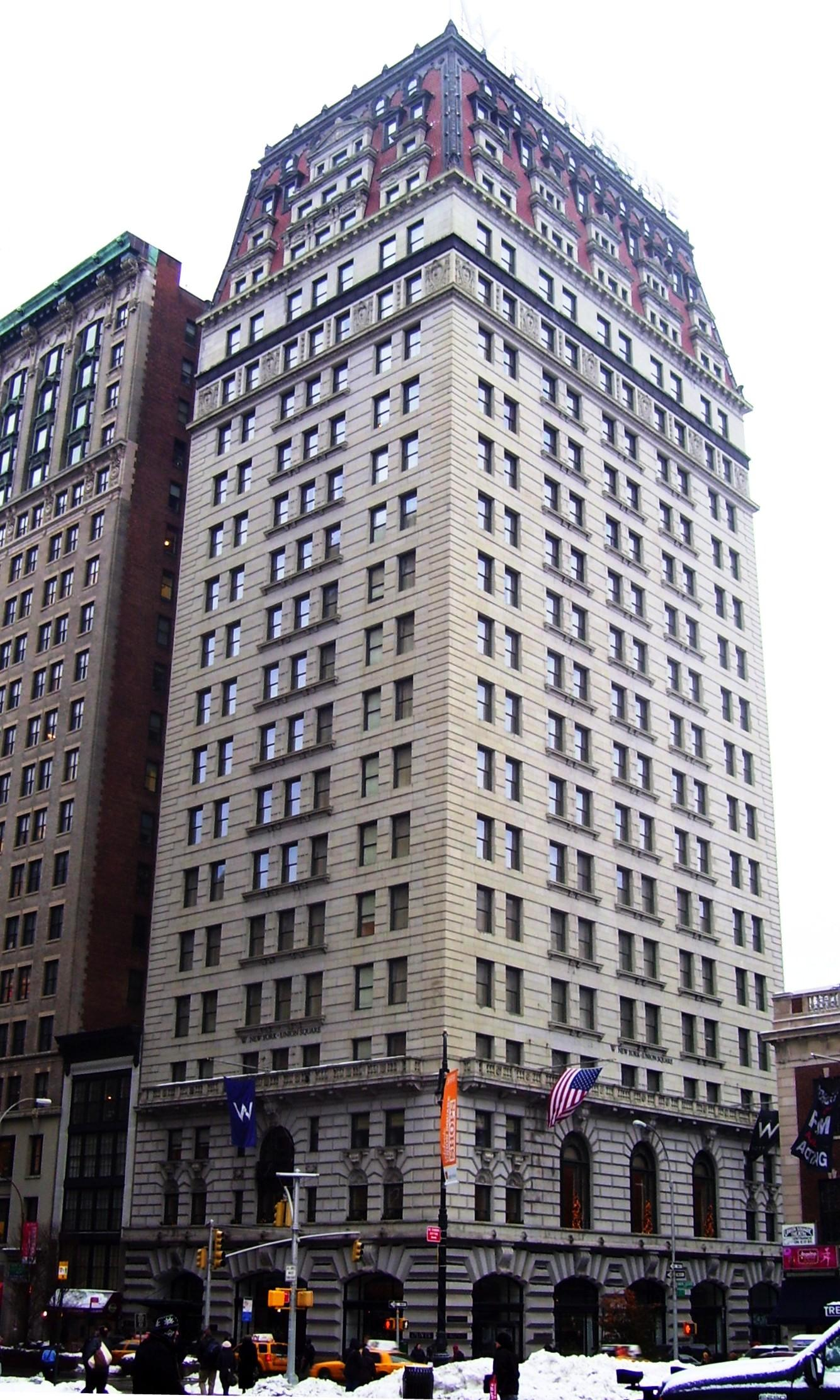
Former Germania Life Insurance Company Building, now the W New York Union Square Hotel

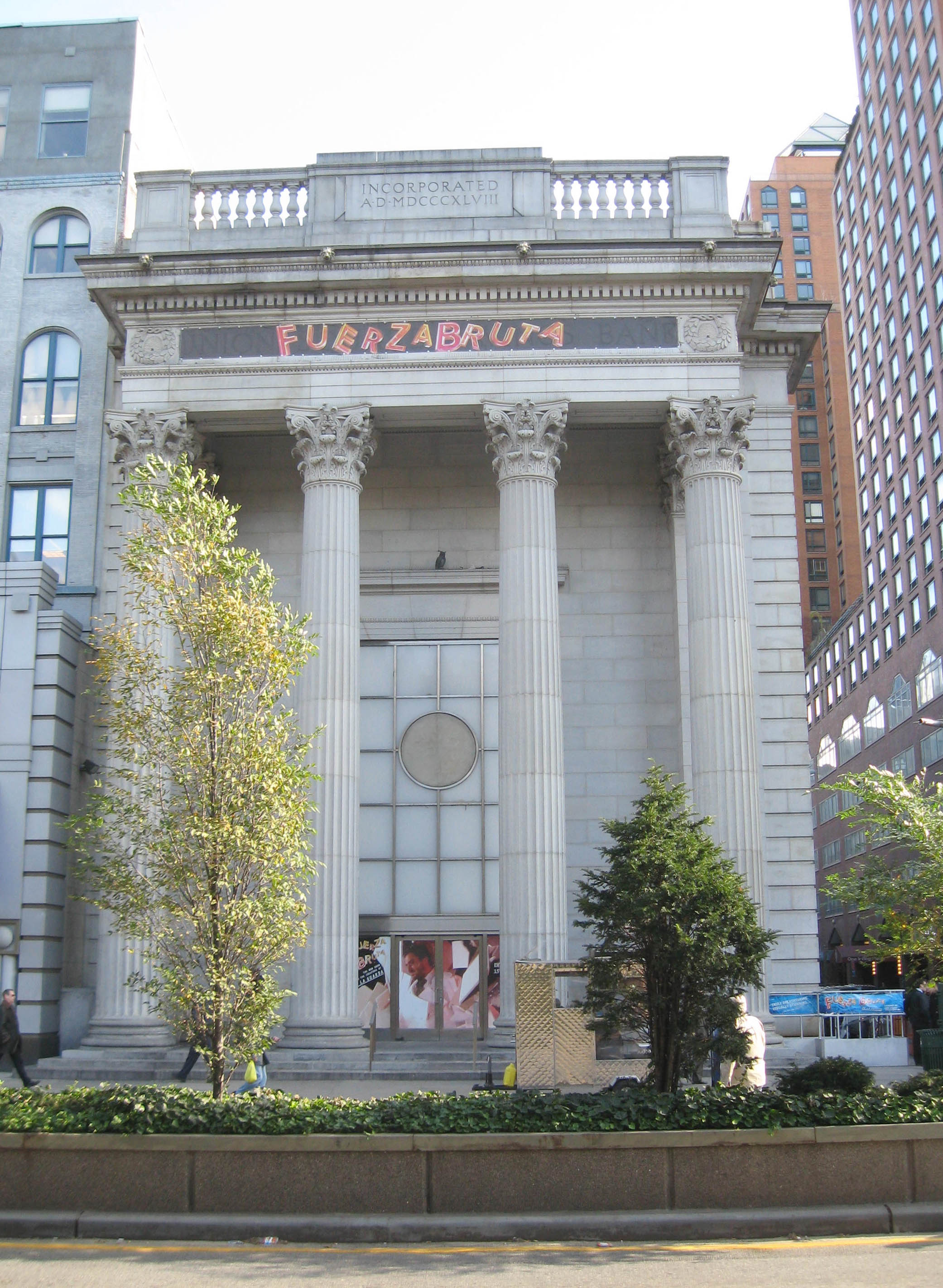
Former Union Square Savings Bank, now the Daryl Roth Theatre

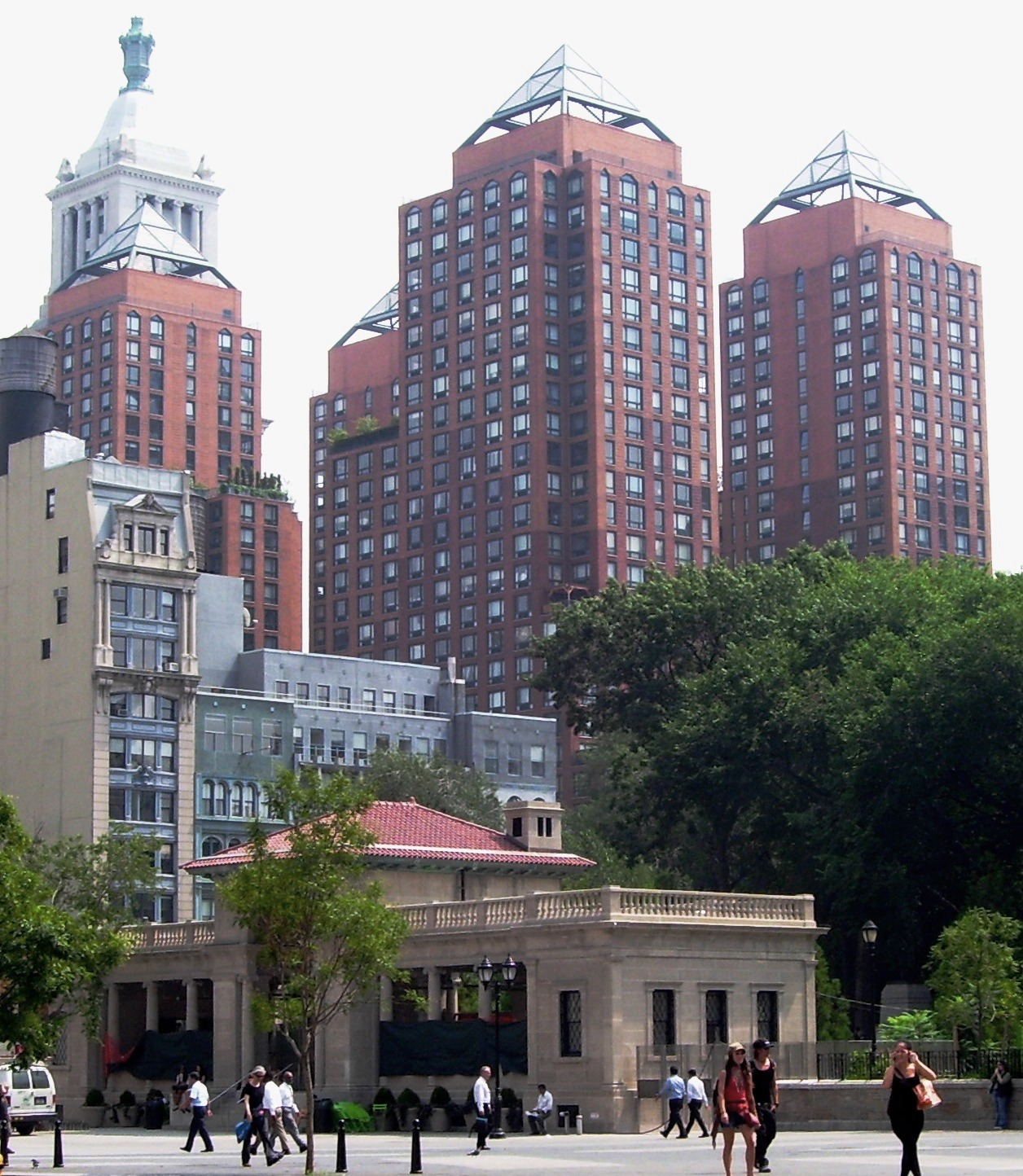
Zeckendorf Towers with the renovated north plaza of the park in the foreground, and the Con Ed Building in the background

== See also ==
- East Side (Manhattan)
- Flatiron District
- Gramercy Park
- Washington Square Park
- List of National Historic Landmarks in New York City
- Madison Square
- USS Recruit (1917)
- MacDougal Street
