= Equestrian statue of George Washington (New York City) =

Equestrian statue by Henry Kirke Brown in Manhattan, New York, U.S.

Coordinates: 40°44′7.3″N 73°59′26.5″W

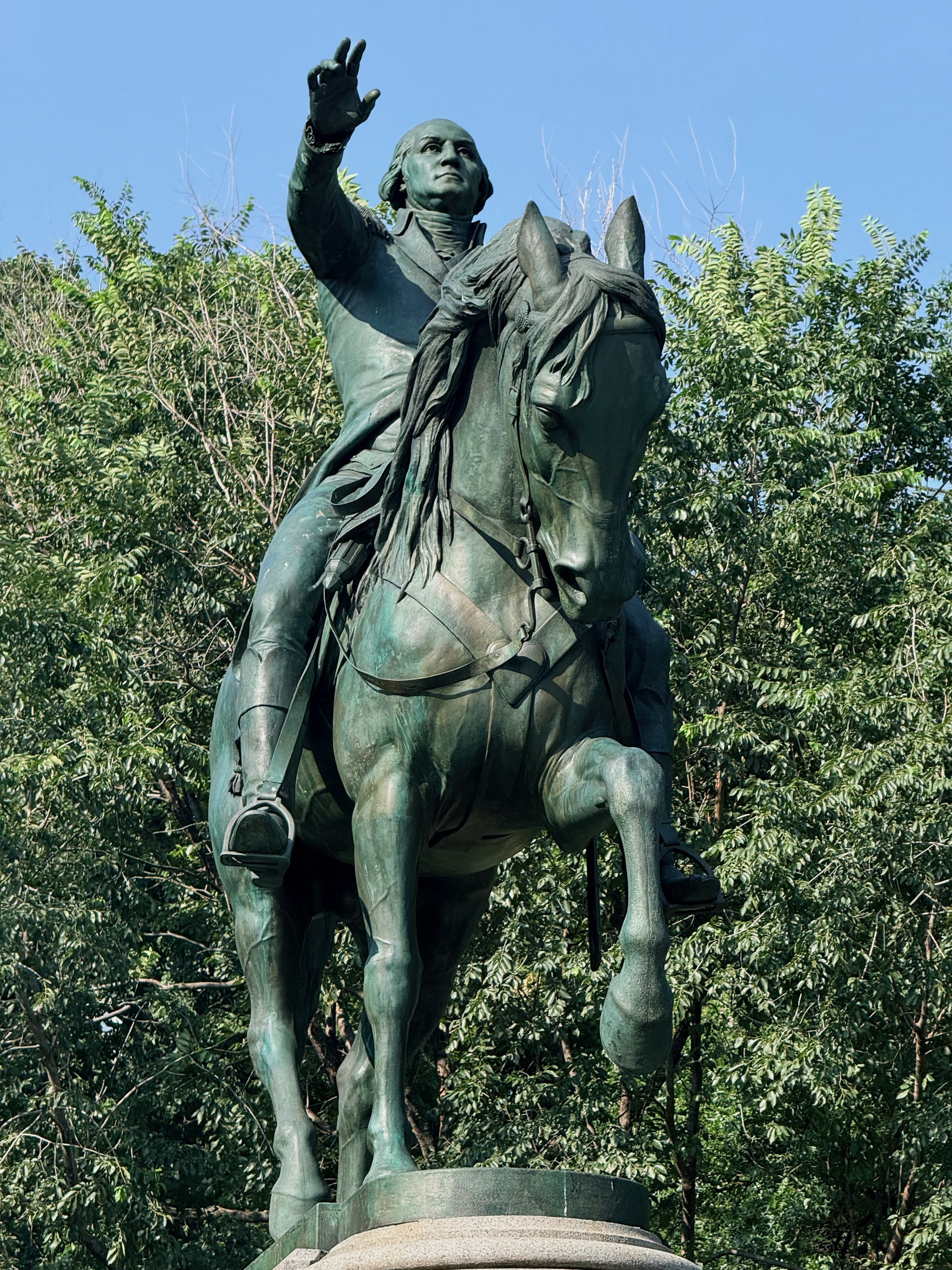
- The statue in 2026.
- Artist: Henry Kirke Brown
- Year: 1856
- Type: Sculpture
- Medium: Bronze
- Subject: George Washington
- Location: New York City, New York, United States

- Equestrian statue of George Washington
- U.S. National Register of Historic Places
- U.S. Historic district – Contributing property
- Location: Manhattan, New York City, New York, United States
- Part of: Union Square
- NRHP reference No.: 97001678
- Added to NRHP: December 9, 1997

George Washington is an outdoor sculpture by Henry Kirke Brown (1814–1886), located in Union Square, Manhattan, in the United States. The bronze equestrian statue was dedicated in 1856 and is the oldest sculpture in the New York City Parks collection. It depicts George Washington beginning his triumphant march of the Continental Army through Manhattan on Evacuation Day, November 25, 1783, soon after the British Army had departed New York City.

== Description and history ==
Richard Upjohn served as architect for the pedestal / plinth. The sculpture measures 26'4" by 13'6" and sits on a Barre granite pedestal that measures 12'2" by 7'9" by 15'. It was dedicated on July 4, 1856. The monument is in axial alignment with the statue of Abraham Lincoln and the Independence Flagstaff.

The statue was climbed on by some rioters during the 2023 Union Square riot.

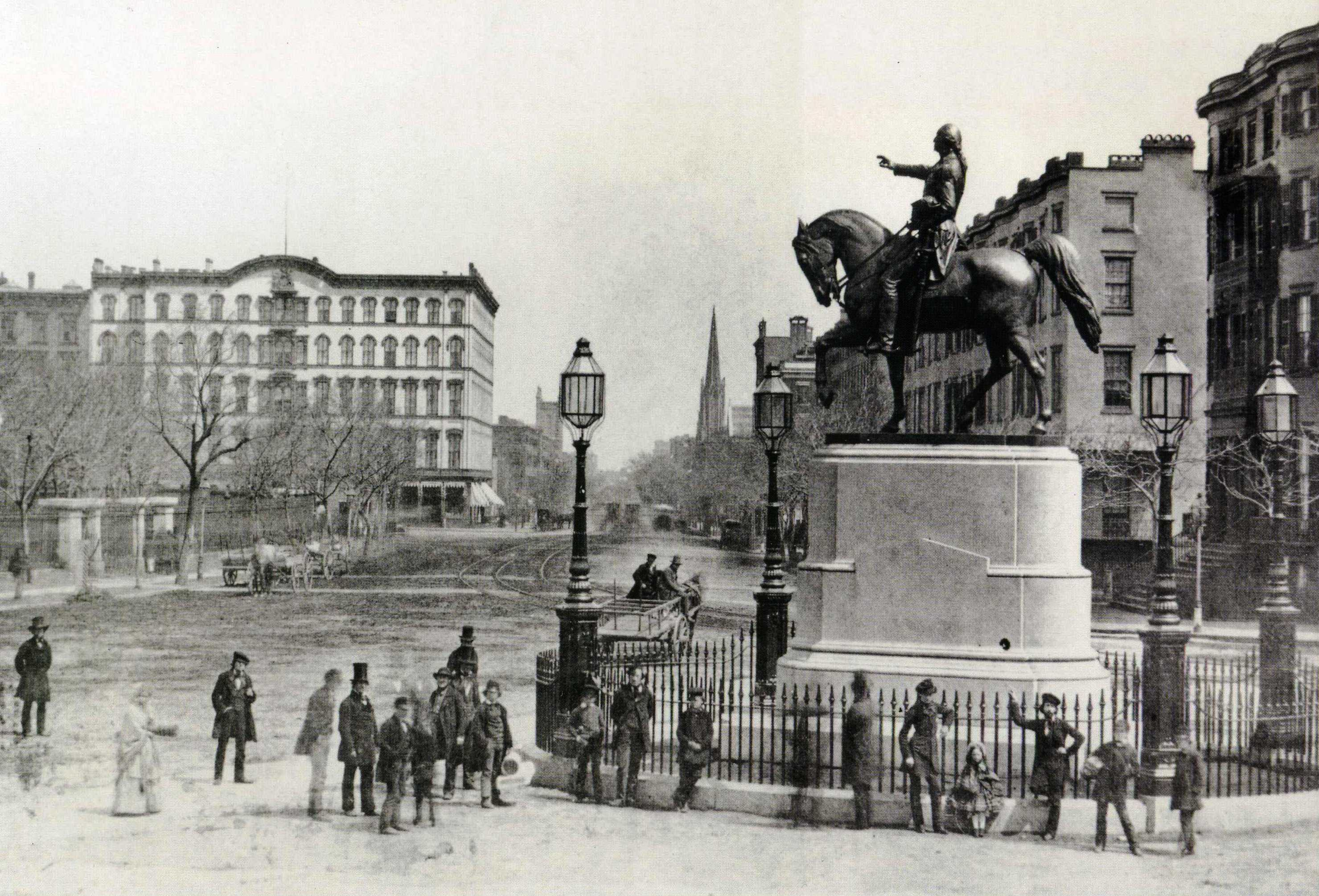
The statue in the middle of Fourth Avenue at 14th Street, c.1870

== See also ==
- Cultural depictions of George Washington
- List of memorials to George Washington
- List of sculptures of presidents of the United States
- List of statues of George Washington
