= Independence Flagstaff =

Memorial in Manhattan, New York, U.S.

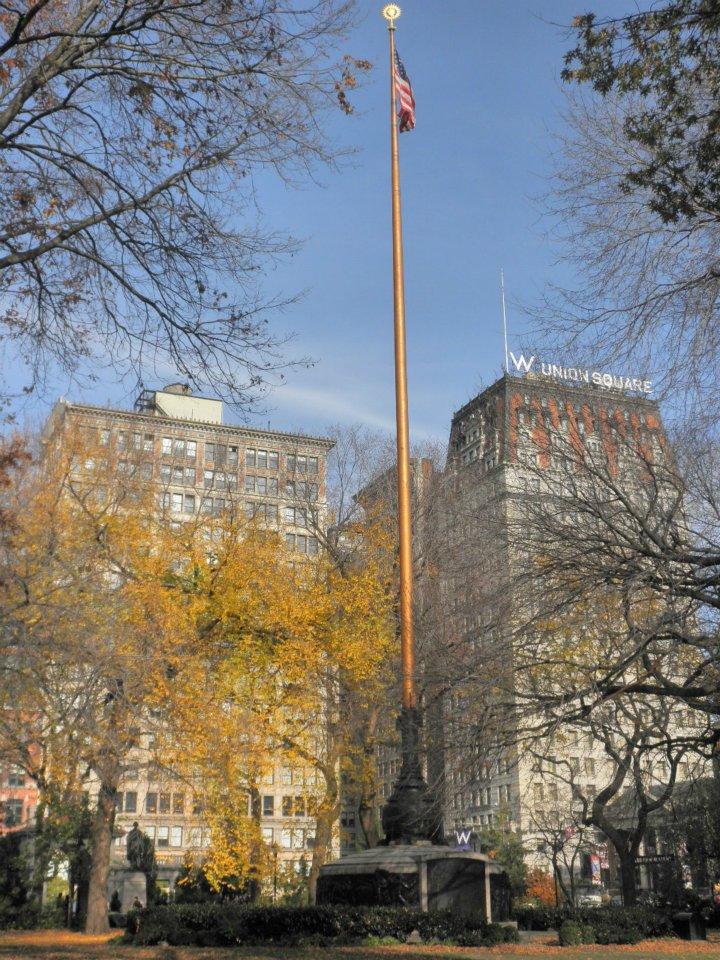
- The monument in 2012
- Interactive map of Independence Flagstaff
- Location: Manhattan, New York, United States
- Coordinates: 40°44′09″N 73°59′25″W
- Designer: Anthony de Francisci
- Height: 40 ft (12 m)

Independence Flagstaff, also known as the Charles F. Murphy Memorial Flagpole, is an outdoor memorial by sculptor Anthony de Francisci, located in Union Square Park in Manhattan, New York, which commemorates the 150th anniversary of the signing of the United States Declaration of Independence. The memorial was cast in 1926 and dedicated on July 4, 1930. It was made of steel, with copper sheathing, and is set on a granite pedestal which includes bronze bas-reliefs and plaques. The monument is in axial alignment with Henry Kirke Brown's statues of George Washington and Abraham Lincoln.

The flagpole was originally planned as a memorial to Charles Francis Murphy, but was changed to commemorate the signing of the Declaration of Independence as a result of public opposition to a memorial to Murphy.
