= Statue of the Marquis de Lafayette (New York City) =

Statue in Manhattan, New York, U.S.

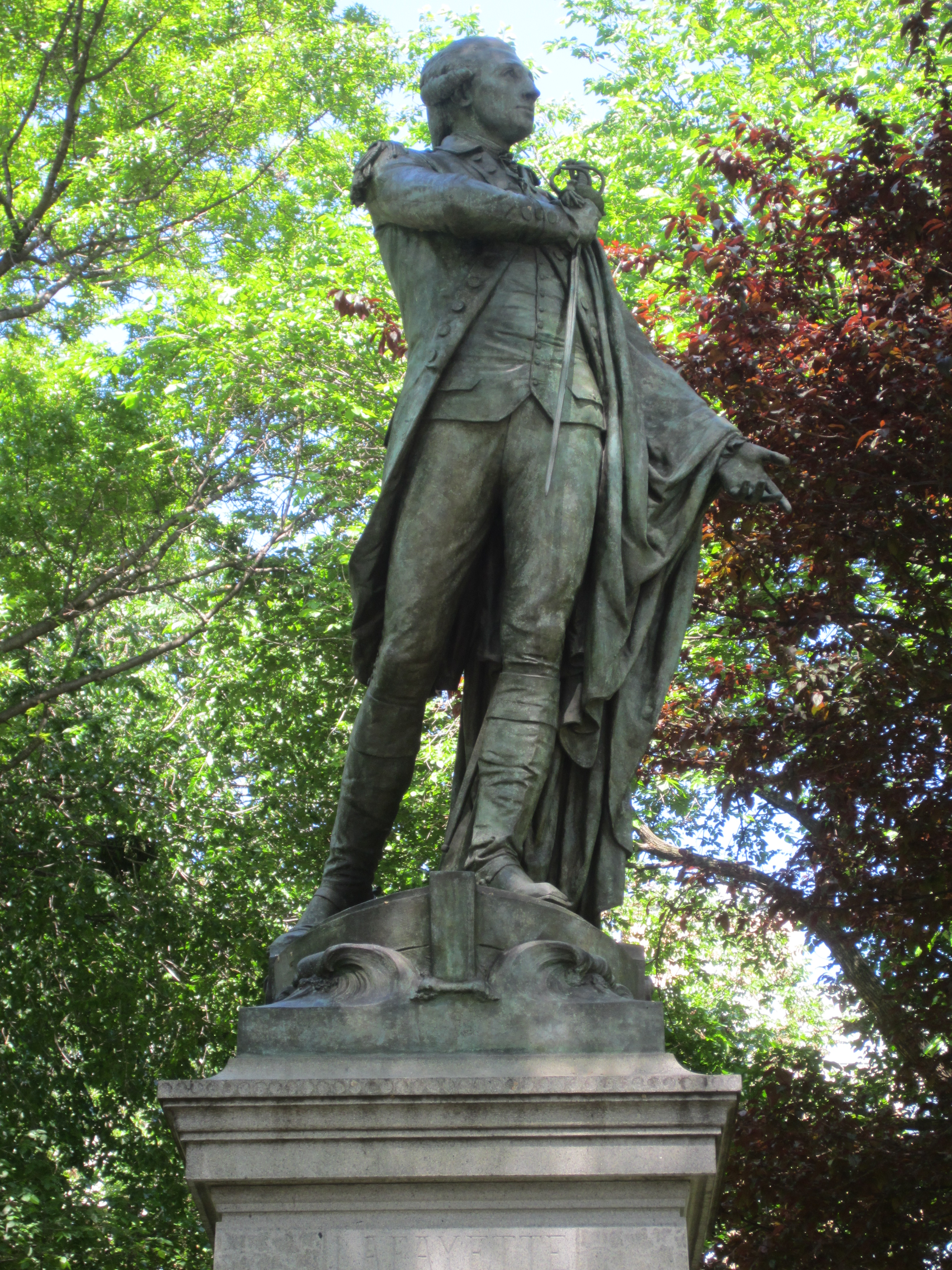
- The statue in 2014
- Artist: Frédéric Auguste Bartholdi
- Year: 1876
- Type: Statue
- Medium: Bronze
- Subject: Gilbert du Motier, Marquis de Lafayette
- Location: New York City, New York, United States; 40.73568°N 73.98997°W
- Statue of the Marquis de Lafayette
- U.S. National Register of Historic Places
- U.S. Historic district – Contributing property
- Location: Manhattan, New York City, New York, United States
- Part of: Union Square
- NRHP reference No.: 97001678
- Added to NRHP: December 9, 1997

Marquis de Lafayette is an outdoor bronze sculpture of Gilbert du Motier, Marquis de Lafayette by artist Frédéric Auguste Bartholdi, located at Union Square Park in Manhattan, New York.

== Description and history ==
Donated by French residents of New York and dedicated on September 6, 1876, the portrait statue rests on a Quincy granite pedestal. In 1991, it was conserved by the Municipal Art Society and the New York City Art Commission's joint Adopt-A-Monument Program.

== See also ==
- 1876 in art
