= Statue of Mahatma Gandhi (New York City) =

Bronze sculpture in Manhattan, New York, U.S.

Mohandas Gandhi
- The statue in 2008
- Artist: Kantilal B. Patel
- Year: 1986
- Type: Sculpture
- Medium: Bronze
- Subject: Mahatma Gandhi
- Location: Manhattan, New York City, United States; 40.73553°N 73.99134°W

A statue of Mahatma Gandhi by Kantilal B. Patel stands in Union Square in Manhattan, New York, United States.

== Description and history ==
The 8-foot (2.4 m) high bronze statue, larger than life size, was donated by the Gandhi Memorial International Foundation with support from Mohan Murjani. It was dedicated on October 2, 1986, the 117th anniversary of Gandhi's birth; civil rights leader Bayard Rustin delivered a keynote speech at the ceremony. The statue was removed in 2001, conserved, and reinstalled in a landscaped garden area in 2002.

== See also ==
- 1986 in art
- List of artistic depictions of Mahatma Gandhi
