= List of public art in Hartford, Connecticut =

This is a list of public art in Hartford, Connecticut, in the United States. This list applies only to works of public art on permanent display in an outdoor public space. For example, this does not include artworks in museums. Public art may include sculptures, statues, monuments, memorials, murals, and mosaics.

Image	Title / subject	Location and coordinates	Date	Artist / designer	Type	Material	Dimensions	Designation	Owner / administrator	Wikidata	Notes
More images	Corning Fountain	Bushnell Park 41°45′59.83″N 72°40′51.76″W	1899	J. Massey Rhind	Fountain	Bronze; Granite				Q5171777	
More images	Soldiers and Sailors Memorial Arch	Bushnell Park 41.76566°N 72.68000°W	1886	George Keller	Arch	Brownstone				Q7557403	
	Statue of Christopher Columbus	Columbus Green 41.761569°N 72.682197°W	1926	Vincenzo Miserendino	Statue	Bronze				Q97356427	Removed in 2020
More images	Statue of Horace Wells	Bushnell Park 41°45′52.5″N 72°40′38.5″W	1875	Truman Howe Bartlett	Statue	Bronze; Granite					
More images	Statue of Israel Putnam	Bushnell Park 41°45′54.5″N 72°40′50.5″W	1874	John Quincy Adams Ward	Statue	Bronze; Granite				Q109103617	
