= Statue of Horace Wells =

Monumental statue in Hartford, Connecticut

Dr. Horace Wells
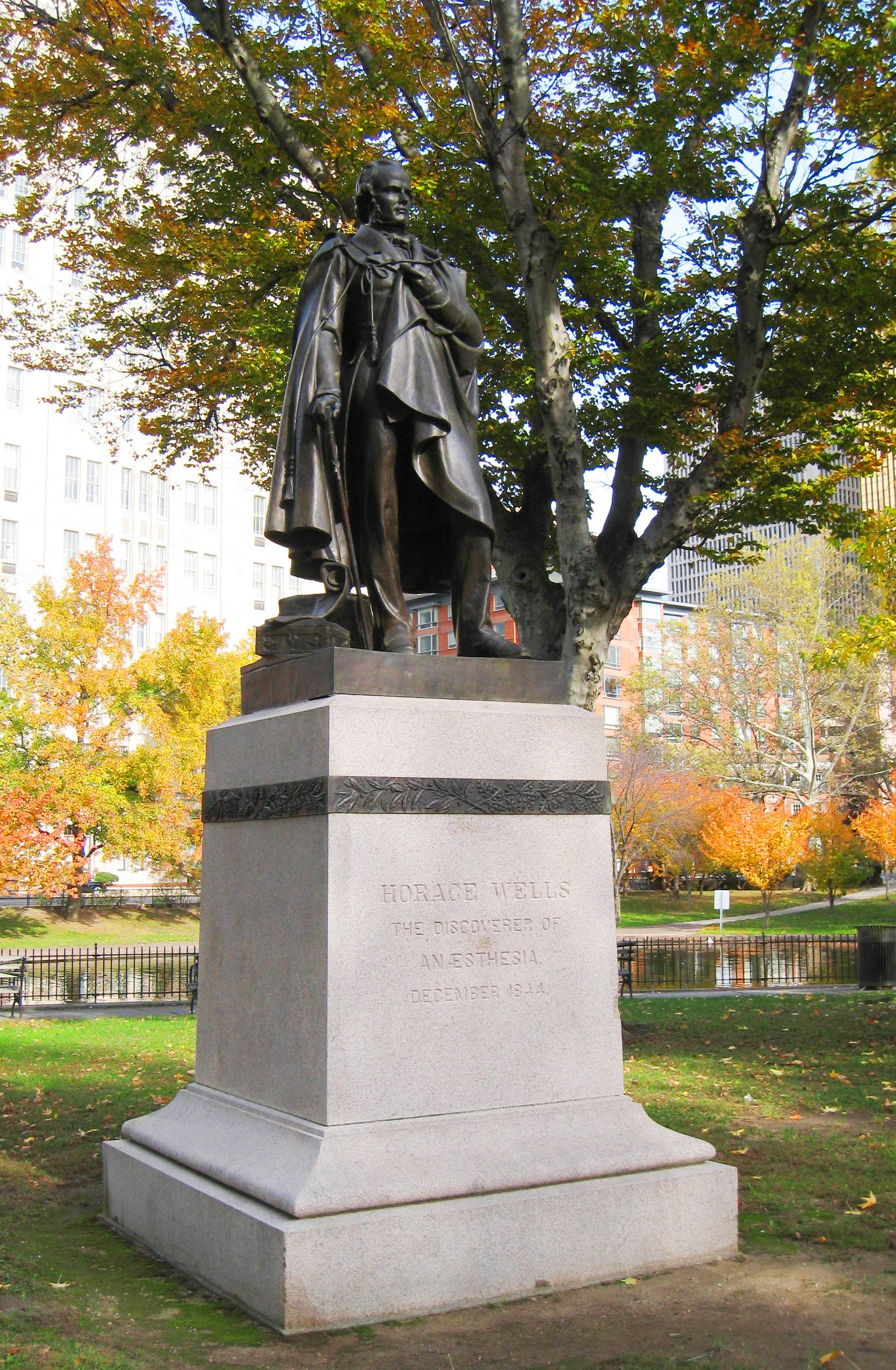
- The statue in 2007
- Location: Bushnell Park, Hartford, Connecticut, United States
- Coordinates: 41°45′52.5″N 72°40′38.5″W
- Designer: Truman Howe Bartlett
- Fabricator: Gruet Foundry
- Type: Statue
- Material: Bronze; Granite
- Length: 7 feet (2.1 m)
- Width: 7 feet (2.1 m)
- Height: 194 inches (4.9 m)
- Beginning date: 1874
- Completion date: 1874
- Dedicated date: July 22, 1875
- Dedicated to: Horace Wells

Dr. Horace Wells, also known as the Horace Wells Monument, is a monumental statue in Hartford, Connecticut, United States. The statue, located in the city's Bushnell Park, was designed by sculptor Truman Howe Bartlett and dedicated in 1875 in honor of Horace Wells, a dentist who was a pioneer in the use of anesthesia.

== History ==
Horace Wells was a dentist who practiced in Hartford, Connecticut in the mid-1800s. In the 1840s, he experimented with using anesthesia to reduce pain during operations and in 1844, he used nitrous oxide on himself during a tooth removal, reporting no pain. However, two other dentists would later claim to be the discoverers of dental anesthetic and filed a patent for their discovery. While Wells tried to dispute their claims, though to no avail, and in 1847 he moved to New York City to continue his practice. However, the following year, he committed suicide. in 1864, the American Dental Association (ADA) recognized Wells as the discoverer of anesthesia.

In 1874, a joint group composed of the ADA, the Connecticut General Assembly, the Connecticut State Dental Commission, Medical Society of New York, and the city government of Hartford commissioned sculptor Truman Howe Bartlett to create a statue in honor of Wells. Three local doctors and dentists (James McManus, Henry P. Stearns, and Hartford Medical Society founding member Ebenezer Kingsbury Hunt) lobbied both the city and state for funding and received $10,000 split evenly between the city and state governments for creating the statue. Bartlett completed his design for the statue in 1874 and it was cast by the Gruet Foundry in Paris that same year. For Wells' face, he modeled it after a death mask of Wells that had been made by an associate of his, John Mankey Riggs. The statue was dedicated in the city's Bushnell Park on July 22, 1875. While the statue initially stood on a wooden pedestal, it was replaced by a granite pedestal around 1890. This pedestal was purchased by the Connecticut State Dental Association. While the Hartford Medical Society would later call the statue "the first public park statue in the United States", several others had been erected in Bushnell Park by 1875, including a statue of Thomas Church Brownell (1869) and a statue of Israel Putnam (1874). The statue is one of several monuments and memorials in honor of Wells throughout Hartford, which include a bronze plaque near the Old State House and a portrait painting by Charles Noel Flagg in the Wadsworth Atheneum.

In 1993, the sculpture was surveyed as part of the Save Outdoor Sculpture! project.

== Design ==
The monument consists of a bronze statue of Wells, standing 8 feet (2.4 m) and with side measurements of 46 inches (1.2 m) and 41 inches (1.0 m), atop a granite pedestal measuring 98 inches (2.5 m) tall and 7 feet (2.1 m) long on each side. Wells wears a suit and overcoat, with his left hand pulling the coat around his chest while he holds a walking stick in his right hand. Near his right foot is a book and a lock box. Signatures from the foundry (Gruet Jne Fdeur) and sculptor (T. H. BARTLETT / PARIS / 1874) are located on the bronze base of the sculpture, while the front of the pedestal bears the following inscription: HORACE WELLS / THE DISCOVERER OF / ANAESTHESIA. / DECEMBER 1844.

The monument is located near the pond in the east part of the park.

== Sources ==
- Adams, Sherman W. (April–June 1895). "The Hartford Park System". The Connecticut Quarterly. 1 (2): 173–179.
- "Horace Wells". Bushnell Park Foundation. Special thanks to David L. Logsdon. Archived from the original on October 21, 2021.
- "Take a Walk through Hartford with Horace Wells, Founder of Anesthesia". Hartford Medical Society. April 29, 2021. Archived from the original on May 15, 2021.
- Rumrill, Alan F. (August 19, 2019) [July 14, 2019]. "A Moment in (Local) History: Horace Wells and the discovery of anesthesia". The Keene Sentinel. Archived from the original on October 24, 2021.
- "Dr. Horace Wells Statue, (sculpture)". Smithsonian Institution Research Information System. Archived from the original on October 24, 2021.
- "Hartford's Own Dr. Horace Wells". WVIT. March 18, 2009. Archived from the original on October 24, 2021.
