= Hartford Medical Society =

American professional association for physicians

- Abbreviation: HMS
- Formation: September 15, 1846; 179 years ago
- Founded at: Hartford, Connecticut, US
- Type: Nonprofit
- Tax ID no.: 06-0384010
- Purpose: Medical and healthcare education
- Headquarters: Litchfield, Connecticut
- Location: United States
- Website: hartfordmedicalsociety.org

Hartford Medical Society (HMS) based in Hartford Connecticut, United States, is a nonprofit association founded in 1846, originally just for physicians, but now open to anyone with an interest in medicine and health care [1] The First Century of The Hartford Medical Society 1846-1946, Hartford CT: Hartford Medical Society, 1946. pp 25 , with a mission designed to "celebrate the history of medicine in our state while promoting the latest tools and techniques that will lead us into the future of medicine and health". The HMS developed substantial library and museum collections and, in conjunction with the Hartford Dental Society, operated the Menczer Museum of Medicine and Dentistry from 1974 through the 2000s. Since 2009, UConn Health has managed the society's collections on its behalf.

== History ==
The Hartford Medical Society originated with a group of fifteen local physicians who had formed the Hopkins Medical Society in 1826. After the Hopkins Medical Society dissolved in 1844, local physicians sought an alternative. HMS enacted its bylaws on September 15, 1846.

The object of this Society is to maintain the practice of Medicine and Surgery in this city upon a respectable footing; to expose the ignorance and resist the arts of quackery; and to adopt measures for the mutual improvement, pleasant intercourse, and common good of its members.

— Bylaws, Hartford Medical Society, 1846

For the first 50 years of its existence, the Hartford Medical Society had no permanent location. Members met in private homes from 1846 to 1858, when the HMS began meeting at the recently opened Hartford Hospital. From 1880 to 1889, members met in the offices of the Medical Library and Journal Association of Hartford, a separate organization whose goal was to build a library of medical literature for its members. The Journal Association dissolved in 1889, only 15 years after its establishment in 1873. The Hartford Medical Society existed alongside the Hartford County Medical Society, which had been established in 1792 and remained active as of 2021.

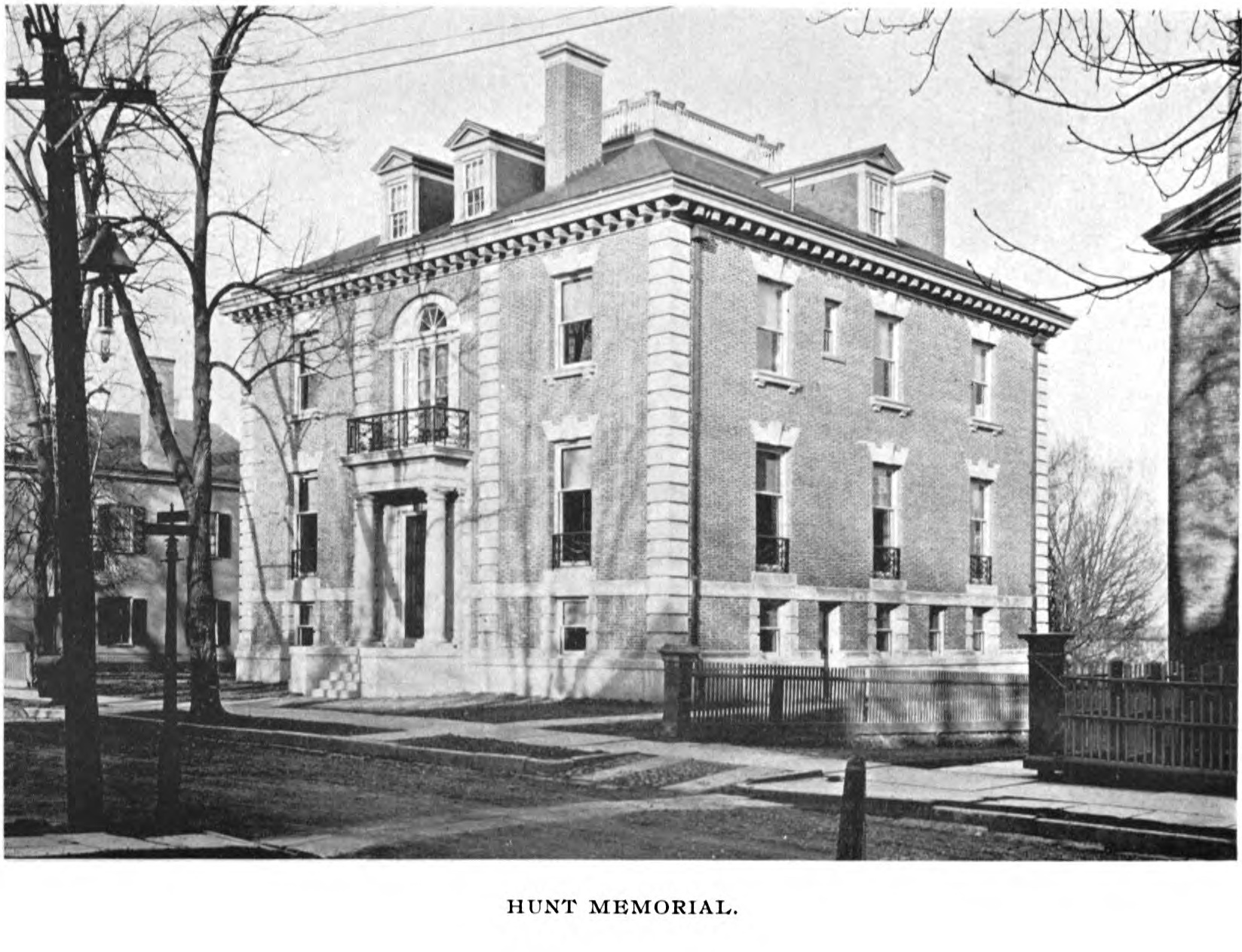
Ebenezer Hunt Memorial Building, 38 Prospect Street, Hartford, CT

In 1893, Mrs. Mary C. Hunt left a bequest of $20,000 to the Hartford Medical Society for the purpose of building itself a permanent headquarters. The HMS accepted the gift and raised an additional $10,000 to fund construction at 38 Prospect Street in Hartford. The HMS dedicated its new headquarters to Dr. Ebenezer Kingsbury Hunt, a long-time member of the society, in accordance with the provisions of his widow's will. Hunt Memorial Hall housed parlors and meeting rooms, a kitchen, an auditorium, a library, a dispensary, and laboratories. Daniel Coit Gilman spoke at the dedication ceremony on February 1, 1898. "The Hunt Memorial Hall," commented the editors of JAMA, "is a model of what should be erected in every large town and city of the land."

With approximately 500 members by the 1950s, the HMS outgrew the original Hunt Memorial Hall. In 1955, the HMS moved to a newly constructed and larger headquarters at 230 Scarborough Street in Hartford. Retaining the Hunt Memorial Hall designation, the new building was erected at a cost of $395,000. Its auditorium could seat 317 people. The society's library and museum occupied most of the building.

In December 2009, the HMS sold its Scarborough Street headquarters for $300,000 to the Jumoke Academy charter school organization, which intended to convert it into a school but left it vacant instead. In 2018, the HMS contracted with the Markens Group to run the society's day-to-day operations.

== Library ==
When the Hopkins Medical Association disbanded in 1846, the Hartford Medical Society inherited its library. The library was housed in the Wadsworth Atheneum and Hartford Hospital before it was moved into the society's headquarters Hunt Memorial Hall. In 1889, the library expanded greatly when it absorbed the collections of the Hartford Medical Library and Journal Association, which had disbanded that year. In 1938, the library was formally named "The Walter R. Steiner Library" in honor of Dr. Steiner, who had been the HMS librarian for 35 years. When the society moved to its new Hunt Memorial Hall in 1955, the library held over 25,000 volumes, including a full run of The Lancet, on three floors of stacks taking up almost the entire building. The Hartford Courant termed it "one of the country's finest collections of medical literature." Due to donations and a dedicated acquisitions budget, the collection had grown to 27,445 volumes by 1965.

In the 1990s, the HMS began negotiating with the University of Connecticut Health Center to manage and house the HMS library. In April 2009, around 6,000 volumes and many artifacts were moved into a newly renovated 2,500 ft² (230 m^{2}) space in UConn Health's academic building's sub-basement. UConn's Health Sciences Library has managed the HMS library ever since.

The collection includes journals, books, and manuscripts as well as artifacts such as old vials and medicine chests, surgical instruments, a physician's saddlebag, and the diary of Horace Wells, a Hartford dentist who pioneered the use of nitrous oxide as an anesthetic. The collection also features 22 manuscripts dating between 1660 and 1730 by Gershom Bulkeley.

== Museum ==
The Menczer Museum of Medicine and Dentistry was a joint initiative of the Hartford Medical Society and the Hartford Dental Society, opening in early 1974. Housed in the Hunt Memorial Hall, the museum featured instruments, equipment, furnishings, and portraits from the 18th, 19th, and 20th centuries, with a special focus on the life of Horace Wells and the history of anesthesia. It began with only four exhibit cases. By 2002, it had grown to sixteen exhibit cases, three wall cases, and nine full rooms of displayed artifacts, representing both dental and medical history. The museum was named in honor of Dr. Leonard F. Menczer, a Hartford dentist who for more than 20 years served as the museum's chief curator and driving force until his death in 1994.
