= Statue of Christopher Columbus (Hartford, Connecticut) =

Bronze sculpture in Connecticut, US

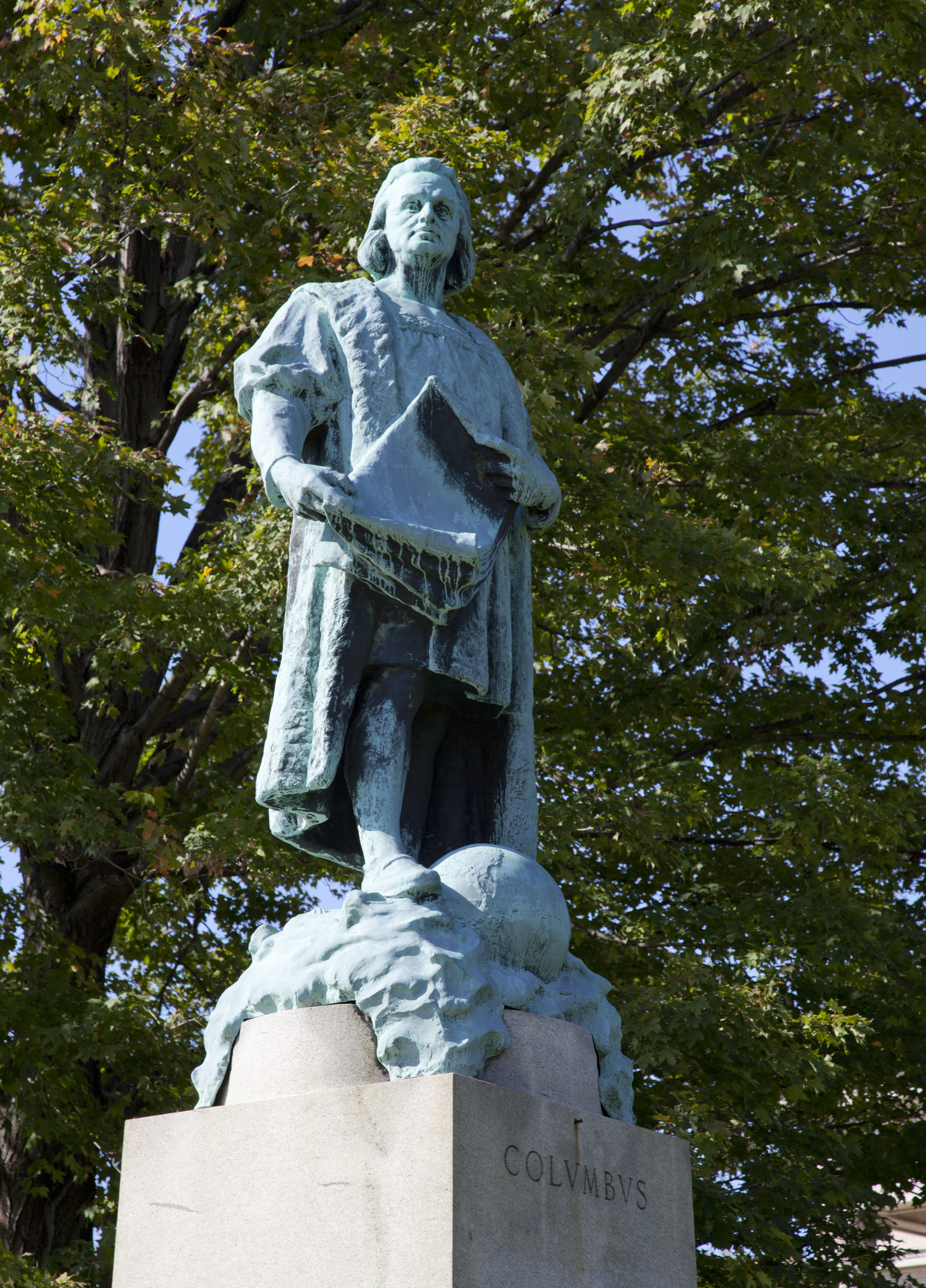
- The statue in 2011
- Subject: Christopher Columbus
- Location: Hartford, Connecticut, U.S.; 41.761569°N 72.682197°W

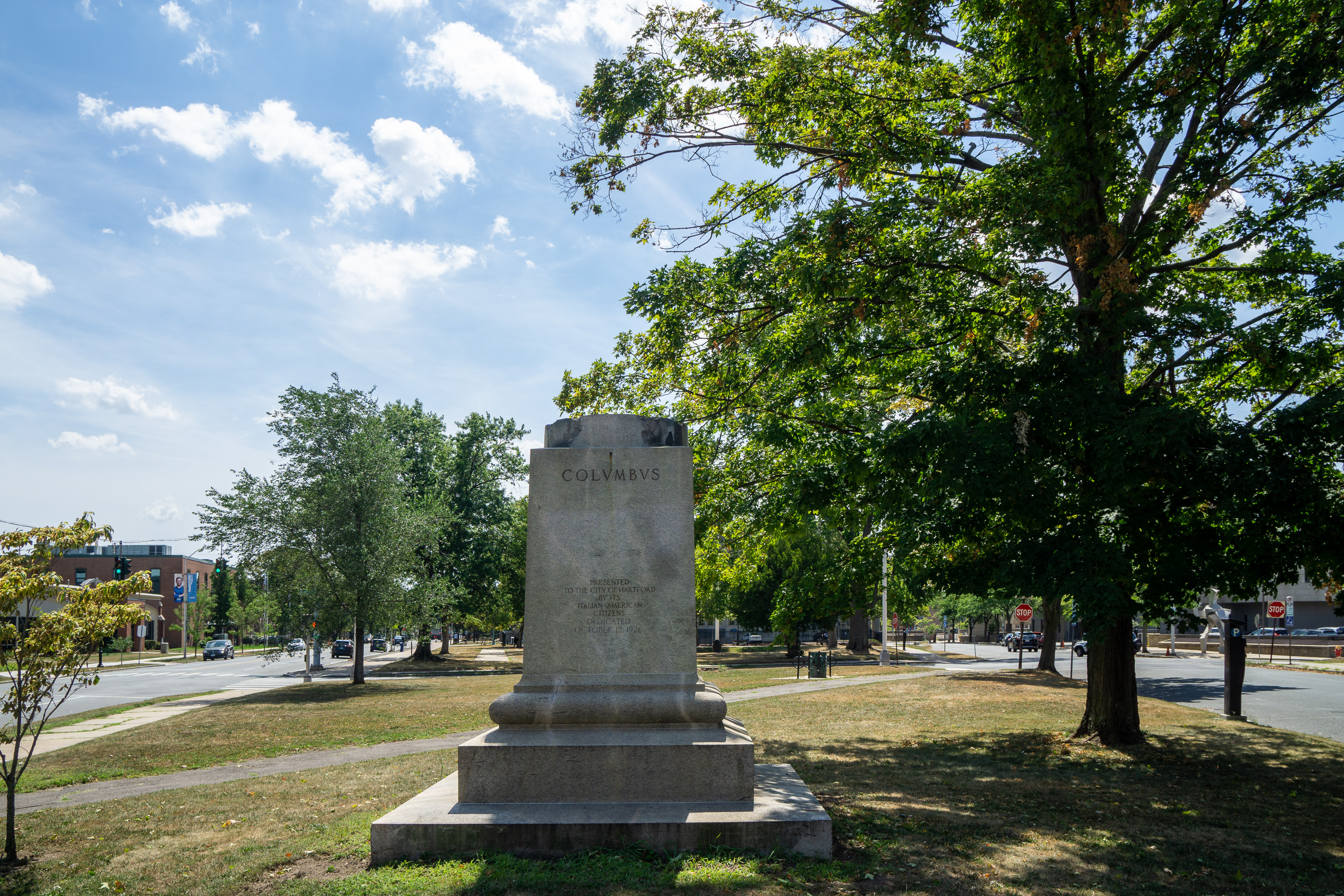
The pedestal in August 2020 after the statue was removed.

The Hartford, Connecticut statue of Christopher Columbus, by the artist Vincenzo Miserendino, was an eight-foot tall bronze sculpture installed on Columbus Green, near Bushnell Park, that was removed in 2020.

== History ==
The statue was a gift of local Italian Americans and was dedicated on Columbus Day, October 12, 1926.

On June 16, 2020, the City of Hartford ordered its removal.

== See also ==
- List of monuments and memorials to Christopher Columbus
