= Gardner Quincy Colton =

American showman (1814–1898)

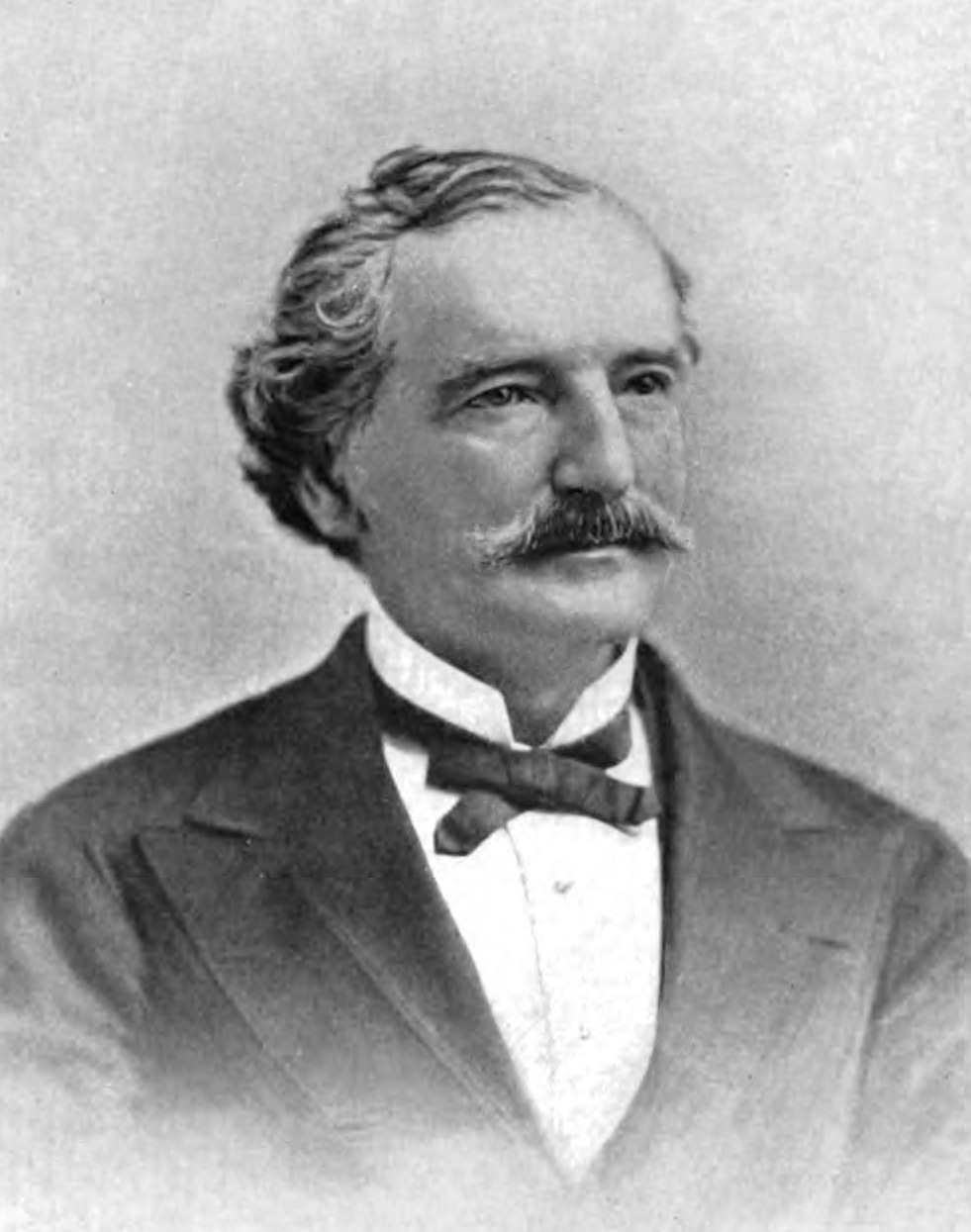
Gardner Quincy Colton

Gardner Quincy Colton (February 7, 1814, Georgia, Vermont – August 10, 1898, Geneva, Switzerland) was an American showman, medicine man, lecturer, and former medical student who pioneered the use of nitrous oxide, or laughing gas, in dentistry.

After making $535 from his first public demonstration of nitrous oxide, Colton left medical school to travel the country giving lectures and presentations. On December 10, 1844, he gave a performance in Hartford, Connecticut, at which one of his audience volunteers injured his leg, but did not feel the pain because of the effects of the gas. Connecticut dentist Horace Wells was in attendance, realized the possibilities of using nitrous oxide in dental surgery, and obtained a supply of the gas from Colton.

In 1849, Gardner Colton went to California, where his brother Walter Colton was the Alcalde of Monterey, to join the California Gold Rush. He was unsuccessful in finding gold, and returned to the East. In partnership with two dentists, he set up the Colton Dental Association, which promoted the use of nitrous oxide in dental procedures and became a thriving business. Between 1864 and 1897, Colton and his associates used nitrous oxide in tens of thousands of tooth extractions.
