= Corning Fountain =

Fountain in Hartford, Connecticut, US

Coordinates: 41°45′59.83″N 72°40′51.76″W

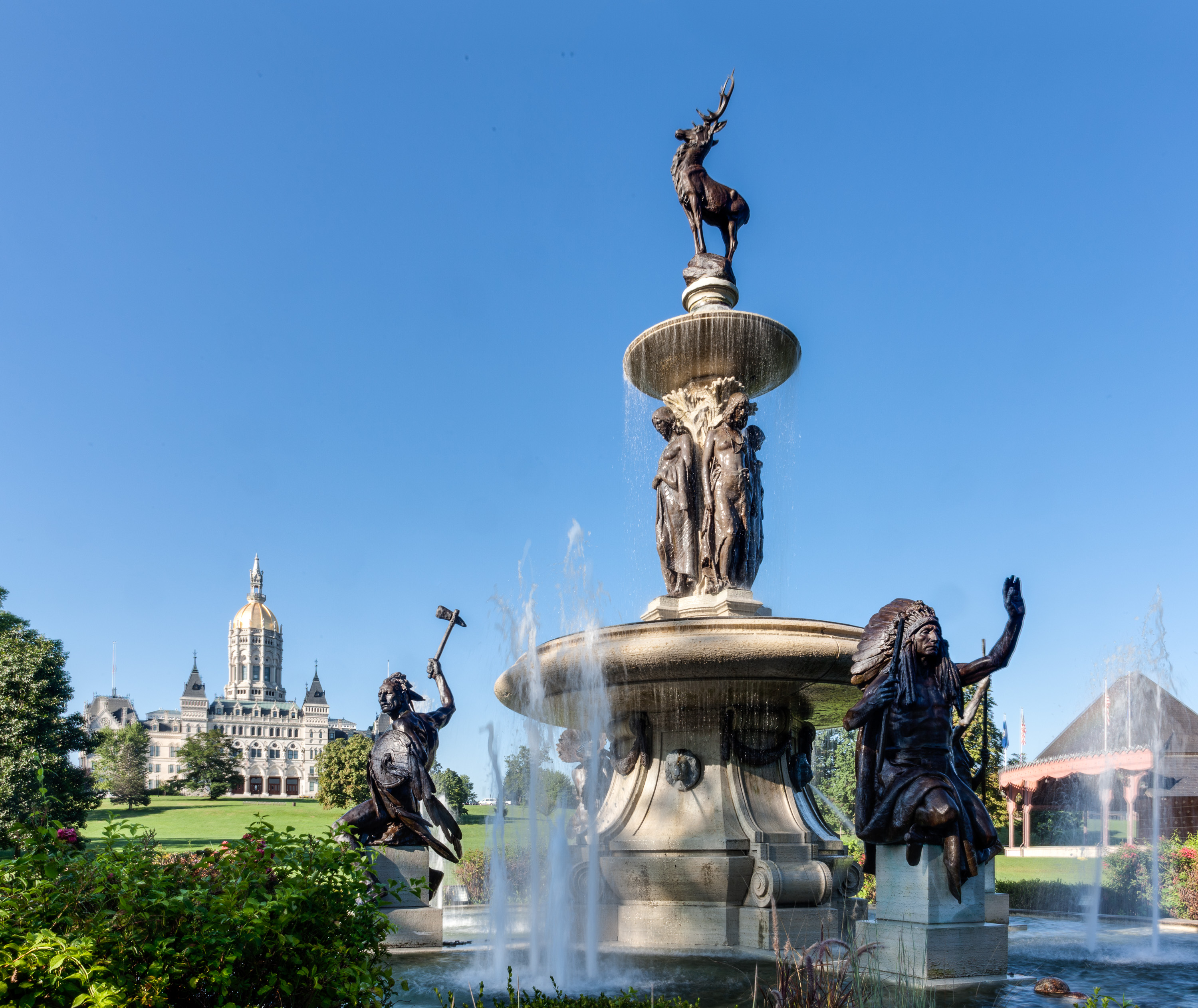
Corning Fountain with State Capitol behind it

Corning Fountain is a fountain with sculpture located in Bushnell Park, Hartford, Connecticut.

The two-tiered fountain was designed by sculptor J. Massey Rhind and dedicated in 1899. It was given to the city by John J. Corning in memory of his father, John Benton Corning (1811–1896), a Hartford businessman who operated a grist mill on the site. It is 28 feet tall, made of bronze and granite, and features stylized Saukiog and Oneida Indians topped with the figure of a stag (hart) as Hartford's emblem.

The fountain features four bronze Saukiog braves around the lower basin, a center pedestal surrounded by four bronze Oneida maidens, and an upper basin topped by a bronze hart. The Saukiog braves are: (west side) holding a spear; (south side) wearing a feathered headdress and scanning the horizon; (east side) raising a tomahawk; (north side) holding a peacepipe and lifting his hand in a gesture of peace. Below the upper basin are four animal heads as water spouts (a catamount, a bear, a fox, and a beaver). As viewed Sept. 15, 2017 these have been removed. Below the lower basin are four lion heads, which are also water spouts. Water flows over the edges of each tier and into a large concrete basin at the base of the fountain.

The text on the bronze plaque in front of the base reads, "THIS FOUNTAIN IS / ERECTED AS A TRIBUTE / TO THE MEMORY OF JOHN B. CORNING BY HIS SON / JOHN J. CORNING 1899."

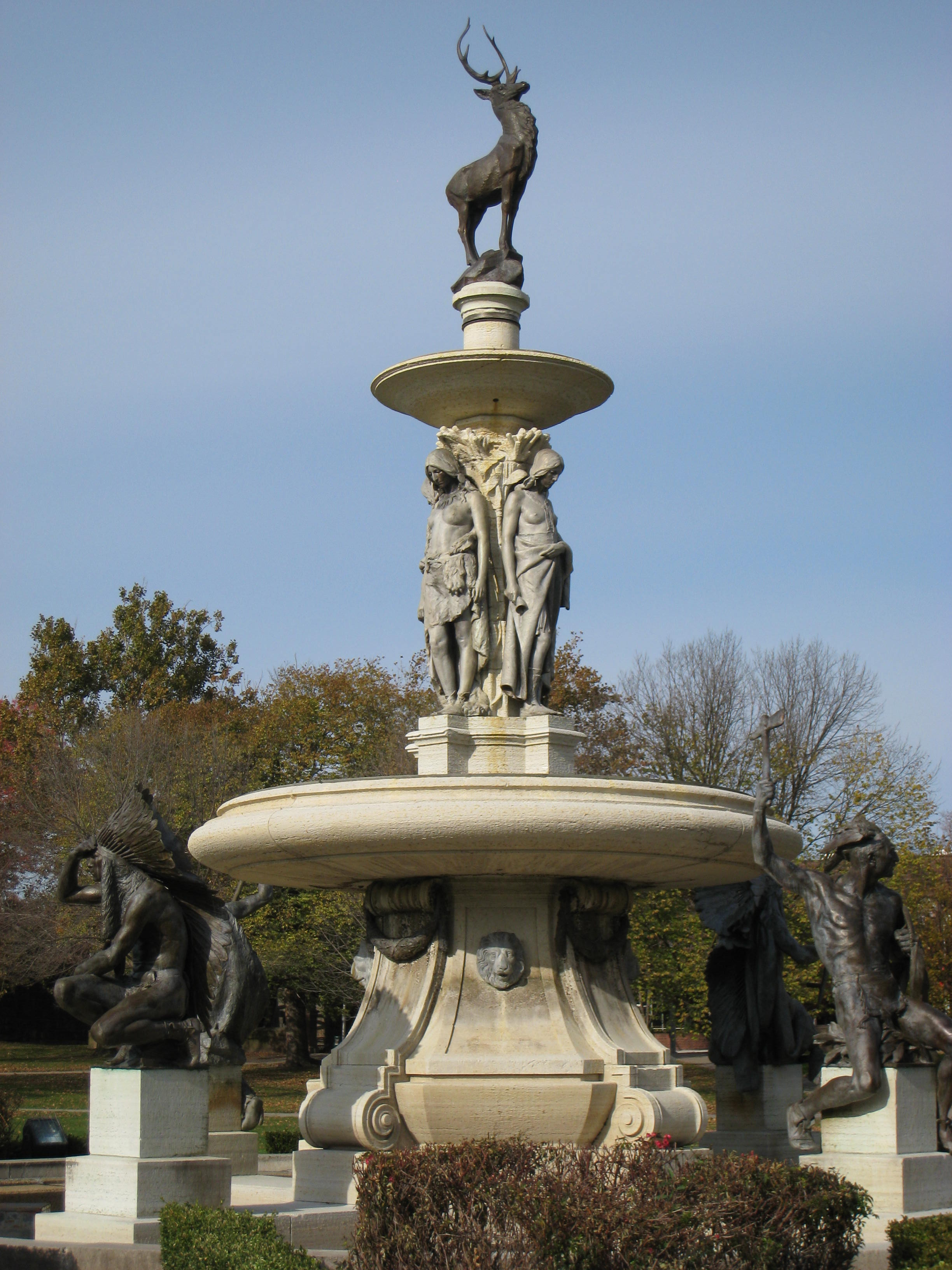

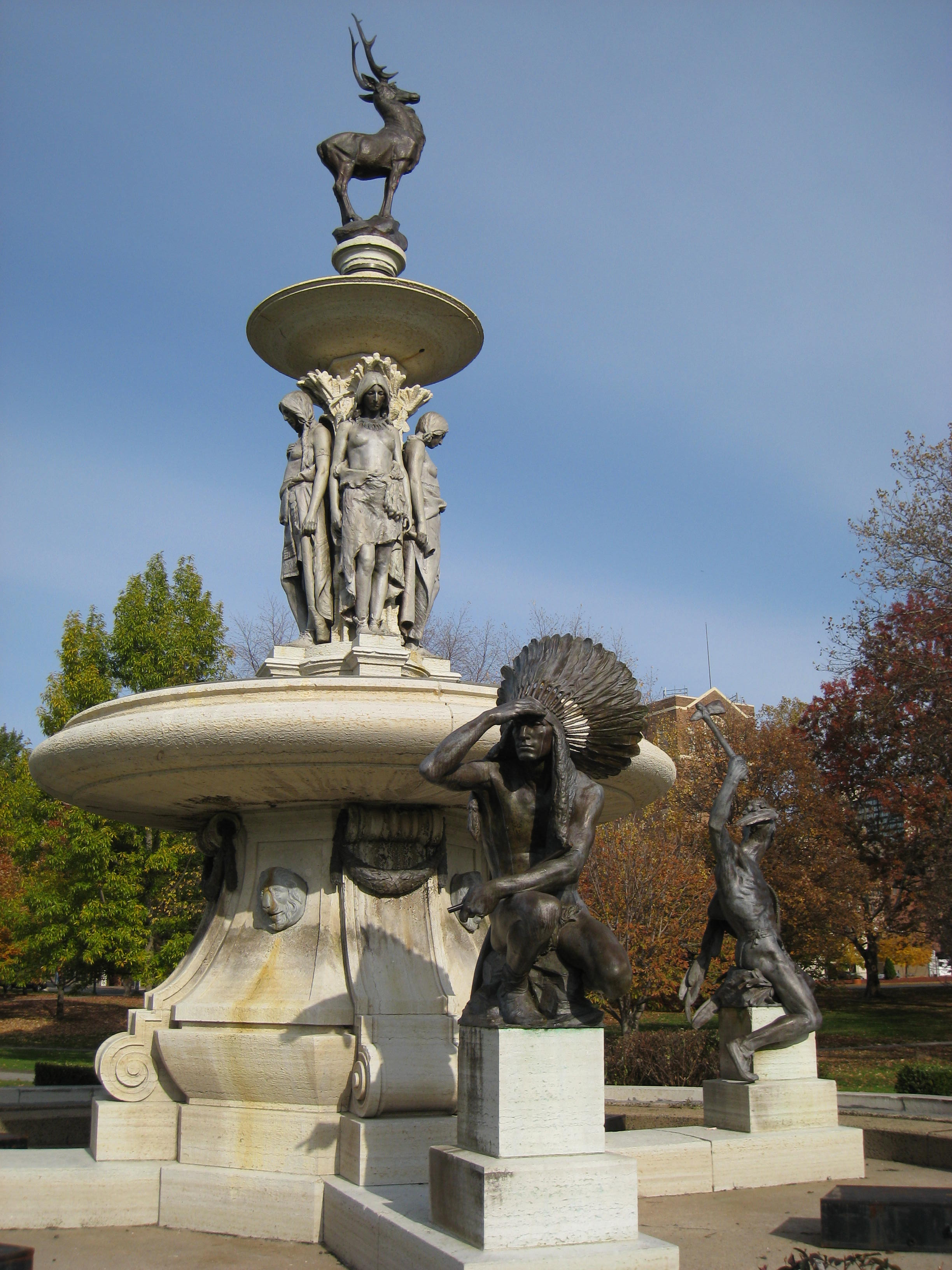

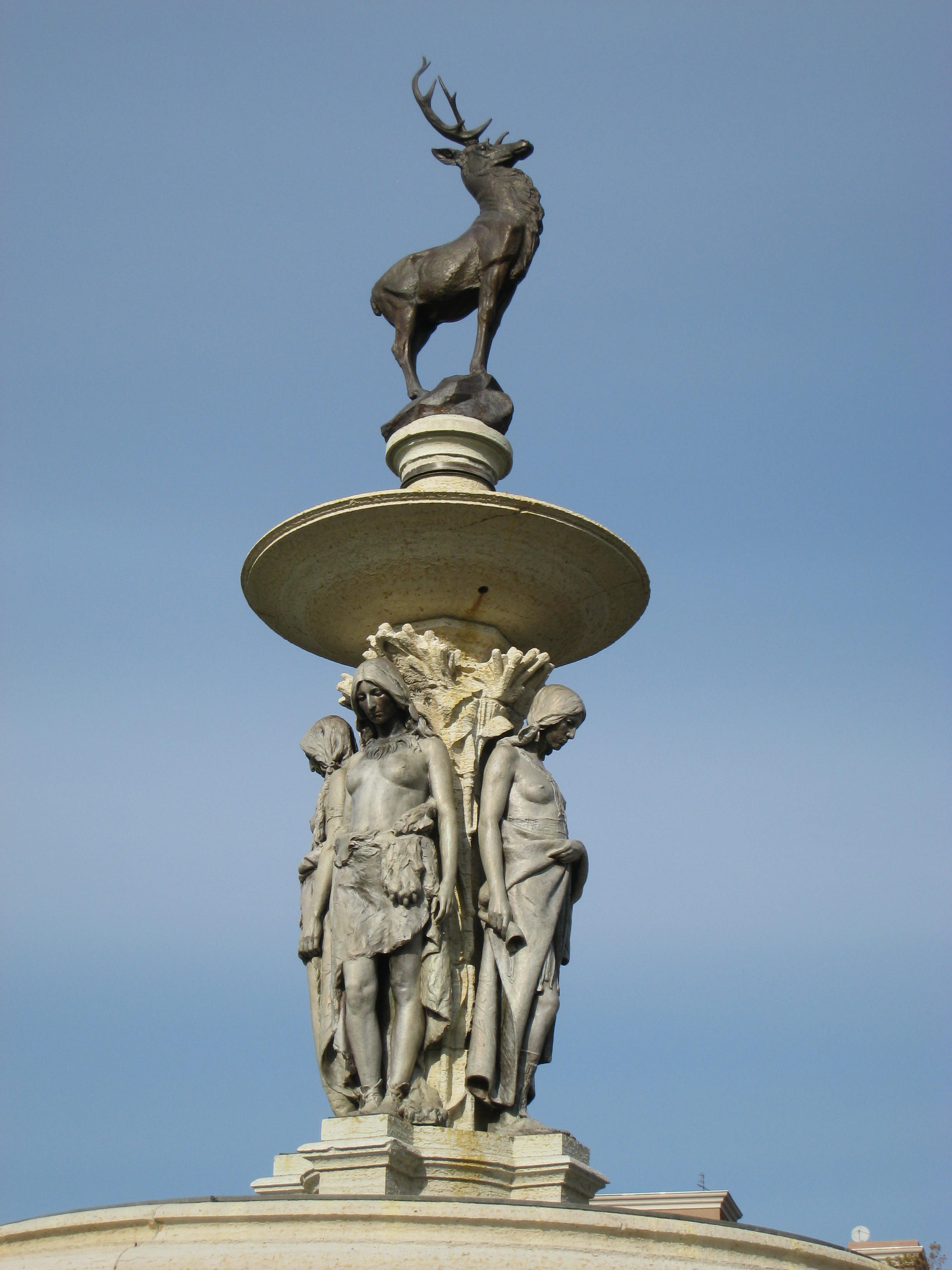

== See also ==
- History of fountains in the United States
