= Bushnell Park =

- U.S. National Register of Historic Places
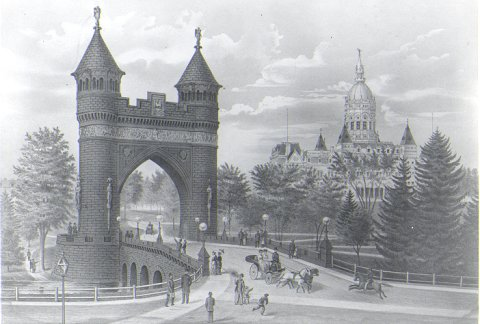
- Print celebrating completion of the Soldiers and Sailors Memorial in 1886 by Kellog & Bulkeley print company

- Location within Connecticut Location within the United States
- Location: Bounded by Elm, Jewell, and Trinity Streets, Hartford, Connecticut
- Coordinates: 41°45′54″N 72°40′46″W
- Area: 37 acres (15 ha)
- Built: 1868
- Architect: Weidenmann, Jacob
- NRHP reference No.: 70000692
- Added to NRHP: October 22, 1970

Bushnell Park in Hartford, Connecticut is the second oldest publicly funded park in the United States, after Boston Common, which was established in 1634, and converted to a park in the 1830’s. Bushnell Park was conceived by the Reverend Horace Bushnell in the mid-1850s at a time when the need for open public spaces was just starting to be recognized. Today the park comprises 50 acres (20 ha) of green space, and is visited by over one million people each year. Paths through the park contribute to the East Coast Greenway.

== History ==
Hartford in the 1850s was a rapidly growing river town, doubling in population from 1850 to 1860. The city's economy was booming, driven by industries such as publishing, insurance, banking, munitions, manufacturing and river shipping. Like many American cities of the time, Hartford was enjoying the benefits of the Industrial Revolution. But along with this growth came some growing pains, including crime, crowded tenements, poverty, poor sanitation, polluted water and air. It was in this context that Bushnell presented an idea that had not been suggested in any other American city: the creation of a public park, financed entirely by public funds.

Initial public reaction was skeptical. Hard-nosed business leaders were opposed to removing taxable property from the tax rolls. Furthermore, it was hard to imagine a less likely place for a green, peaceful park than Bushnell's proposed site, which was home to two leather tanneries, a soapworks, pigsties and other livestock–even a garbage dump. A railroad spur ran through it and the smelly Park River, polluted with the city's industrial waste, ran alongside it. Crowded tenements lined both banks of the river, with their outhouses in the back emptying directly into the sluggish current. Even Rev. Bushnell described it as “hell without the fire.”

However, after hearing Dr. Bushnell's presentation in October 1853, the Hartford City Council voted unanimously in November to spend public funds to buy the land that was to become Bushnell Park. Hartford voters approved the expenditure on Jan. 5, 1854, by a vote of 1,687 to 683, making it the first municipal park in the nation to be conceived, built and paid for by citizens through a popular vote.

Charter Oak Scion

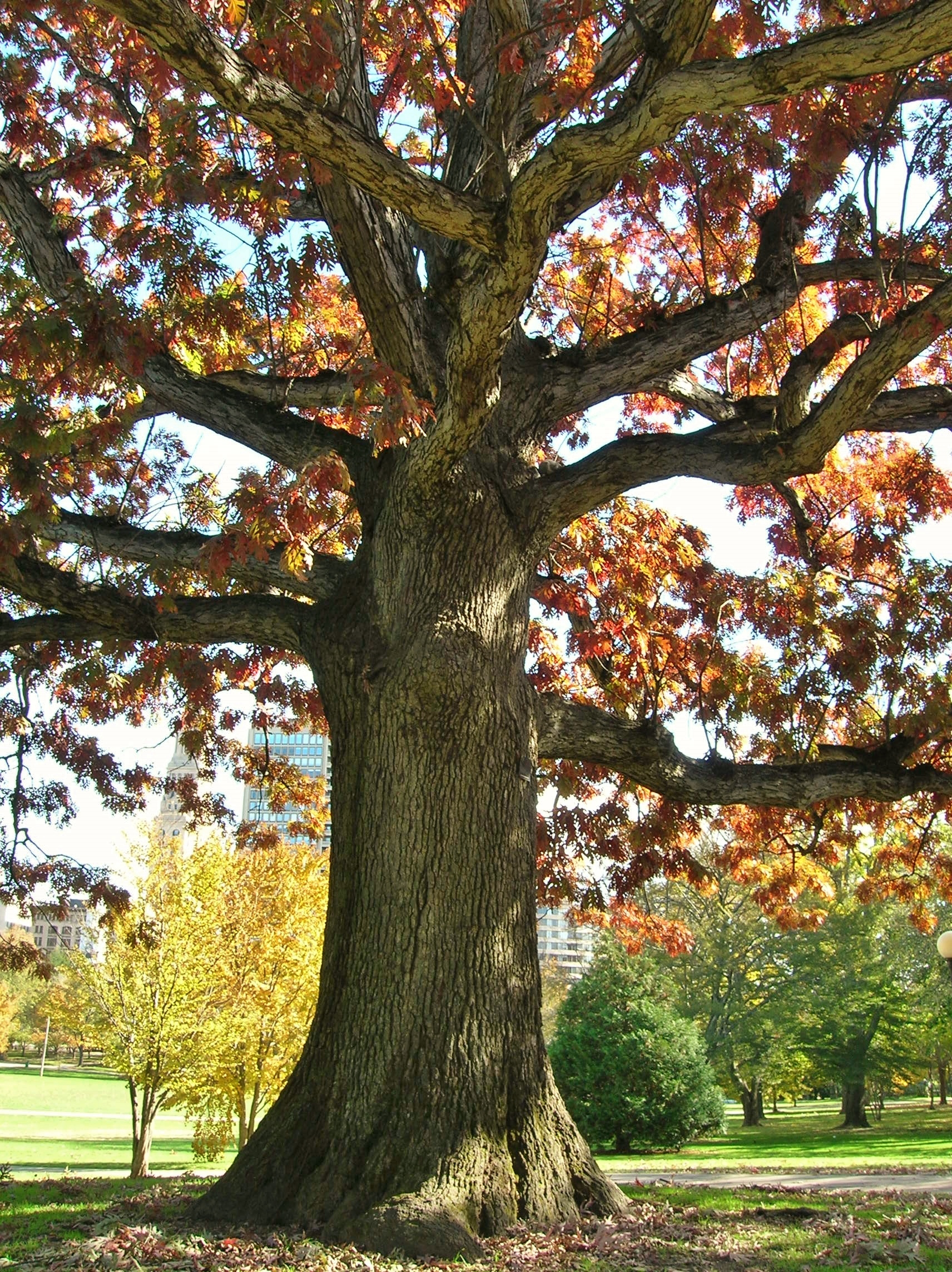
"The Footguard Oak" - a descendant of The Charter Oak in 2011

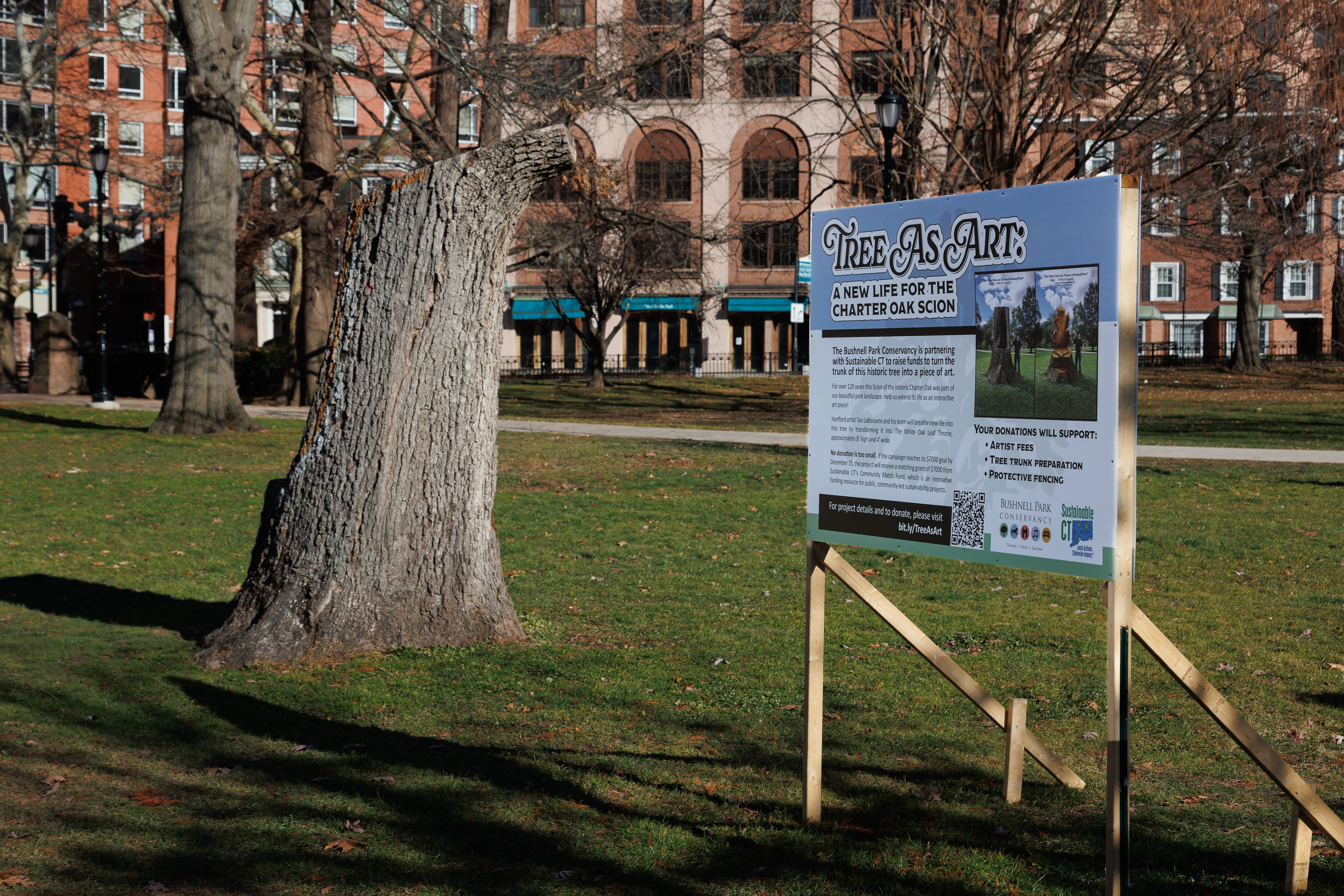
Stump of the felled Charter Oak Scion "Hoadley Oak" in 2023

But six years later the park still had not taken shape. Reverend Bushnell asked his good friend and Hartford native, Frederick Law Olmsted, to design the layout of the park. Olmsted, however, was occupied at the time with the double-duty of designing of New York City's Central Park and Springfield, Massachusetts' Forest Park, and thus declined the offer. Olmsted recommended Jacob Weidenmann, a Swiss-born landscape architect and botanist. Weidenmann's plan for the park included graceful paths and clusters of trees that shielded strollers from the sounds of the city, and enhanced the presence of the Park River which flowed through the park.

Later additions to the park include: the statue of Israel Putnam in 1874, sculpted by John Quincy Adams Ward; the statue of Horace Wells in 1875, sculpted by Truman Howe Bartlett; the Soldiers and Sailors Memorial Arch, designed by George Keller in 1886 to commemorate those who fought in the American Civil War; the Corning Fountain in 1899, with sculpture by J. Massey Rhind; the 1914 carousel in 1974 (with a Wurlitzer #153 Band Organ providing the music); and the performance pavilion in 1995.

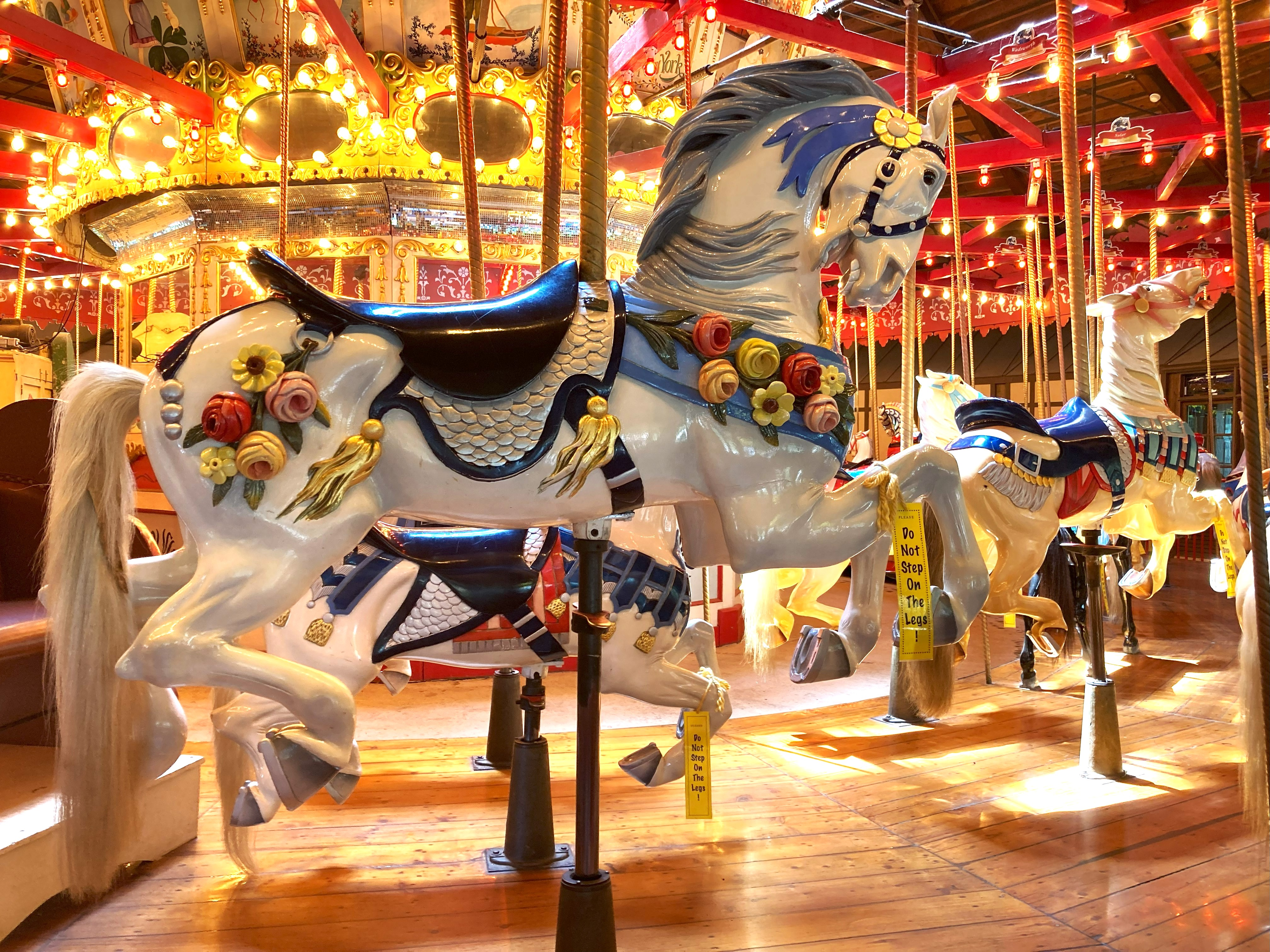
Historic Bushnell Park Carousel

As a result of seasonal flooding and pollution, and especially after damage from the great flood of 1936, the Park River was buried in underground conduits, and a main feature of the park was lost. A pond was later added to return a water feature to the park. Since 2017, the Bushnell Park Pond has been home to Horace, a territorial Great Blue Heron, lovingly named by the local 06103 community to commemorate both Horace Wells, and Horace Bushnell.

Today Bushnell Park is a focal point in downtown Hartford, and it is the site of several festivals and music events each year.

The park was listed on the National Register of Historic Places in 1970.

== See also ==
- National Register of Historic Places listings in Hartford, Connecticut
