= Truman Howe Bartlett =

American sculptor (1835–1922)

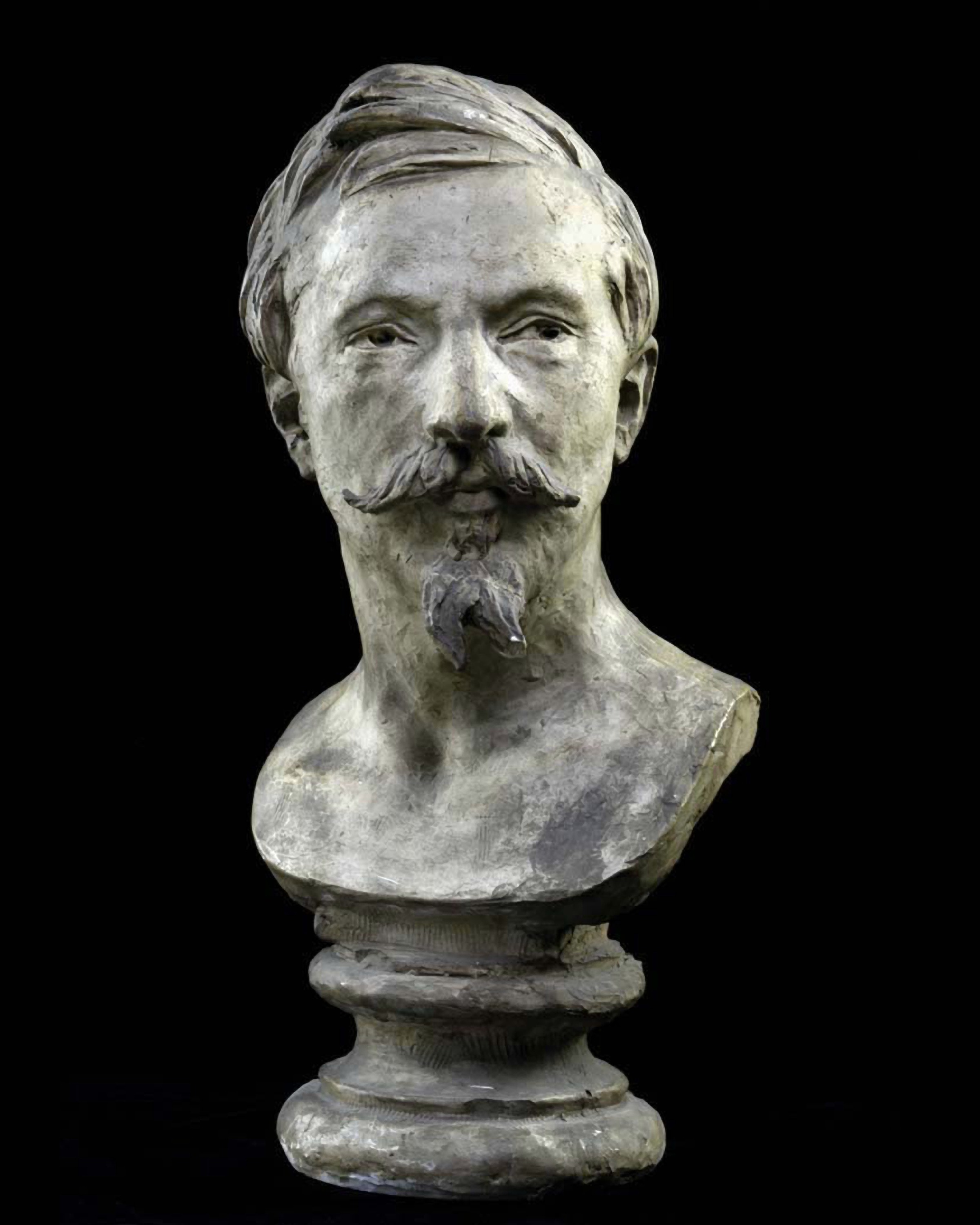
- Bust of Barlett, created 1887 by Olin Levi Warner
- Born: October 25, 1835; Dorset, Vermont, US
- Died: February 17, 1922 (aged 86); Jamaica Plain, Boston, Massachusetts, US
- Occupation: Sculptor
- Children: 1, Paul Wayland Bartlett

Truman Howe Bartlett (October 21, 1835 – February 17, 1922), also known as T. H. Bartlett, was an American sculptor, and father to sculptor Paul Wayland Bartlett.

== Biography ==
Truman Howe Bartlett was born on October 21, 1835, in Dorset, Vermont. He studied under Robert Eberhard Launitz in New York City and subsequently in Paris, Rome, and Perugia. He was active in New Haven, Waterbury, and Hartford, Connecticut, and in New York City. For 22 years he was an instructor at the Massachusetts Institute of Technology's architecture department, and also operated a free art school for poor children. He died in Boston, Massachusetts.

Bartlett ran the only school for sculpture in Boston in that late 1800s. It was located on Washington Street, but later moved to Federal Street. Cyrus Dallin studied with Bartlett from 1880 to 1881. Bartlett allowed Dallin to live in his studio rent free when his funding ran low and wrote positively of his talents. The relationship would sour and in 1885 Bartlett would be critical of Dallin's winning first effort in the competition to sculpt Paul Revere.

Bartlett's best known works include The Wounded Drummer Boy of Shiloh, and the Horace Wells Monument (1875) in Bushnell Park, Hartford, Connecticut. Both bronzes were exhibited in Paris. According to Marquis, Bartlett was the first American sculptor to make a figure in terracotta.

Bartlett died on February 17, 1922, in Jamaica Plain, Boston.

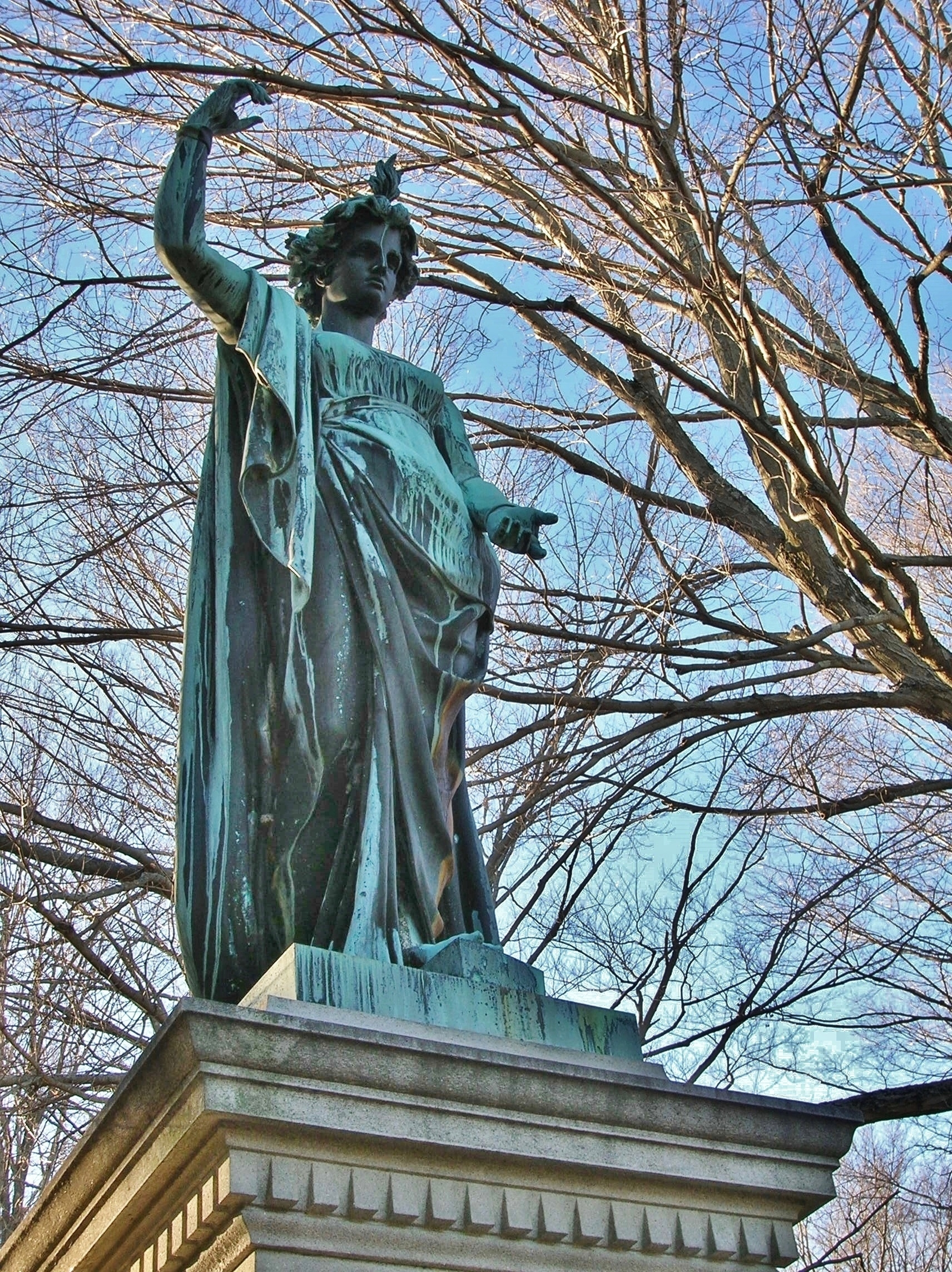
Clark Family Monument (designed by Truman H. Bartlett in 1868; sculpted by Ferdinand von Miller in 1869)

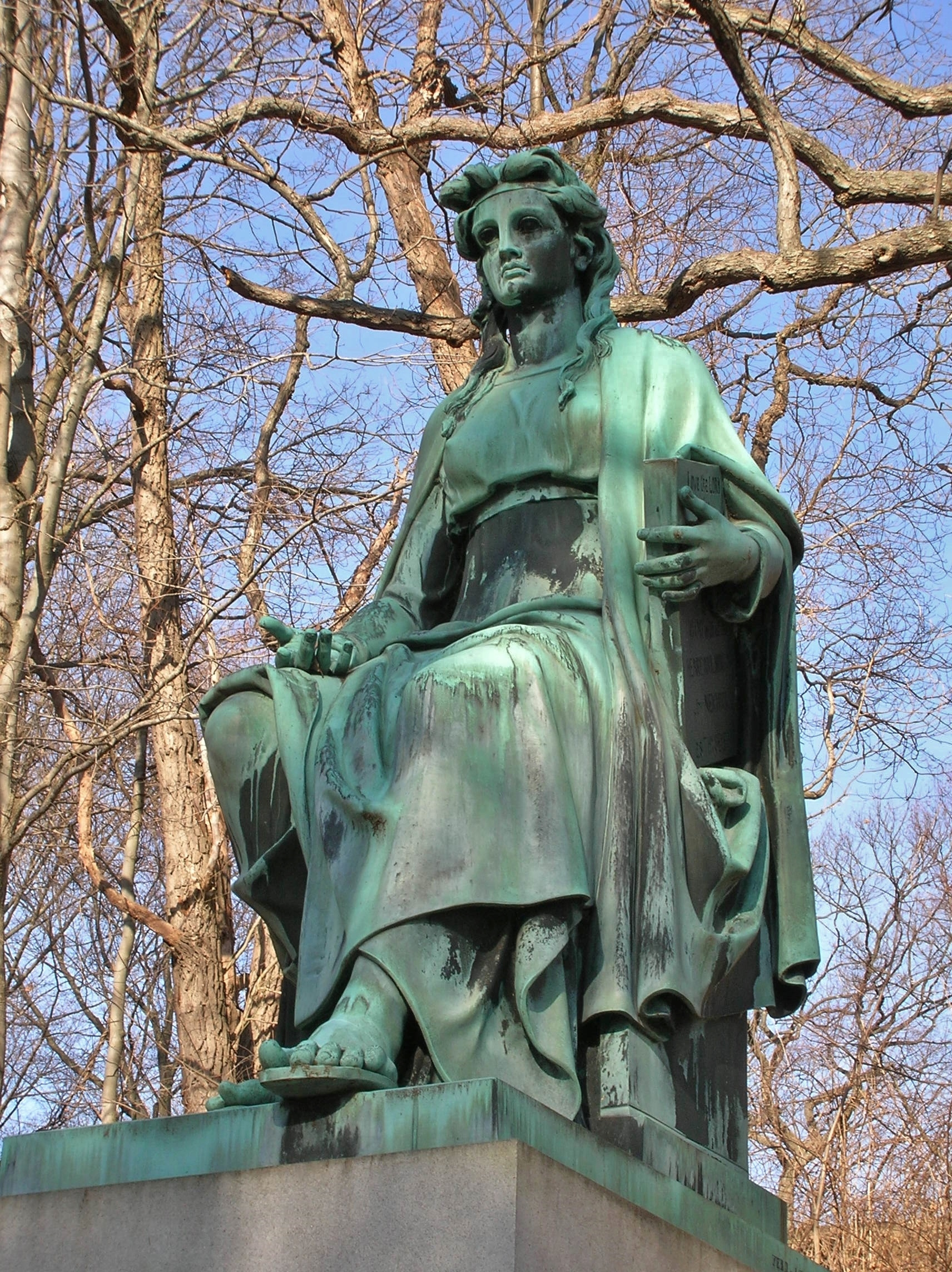
Benedict Family Monument, Riverside Cemetery, Waterbury, CT (designed by Truman H. Bartlett in 1871; sculpted by Ferdinand von Miller in 1872)
