= Ebenezer Kingsbury Hunt =

American physician

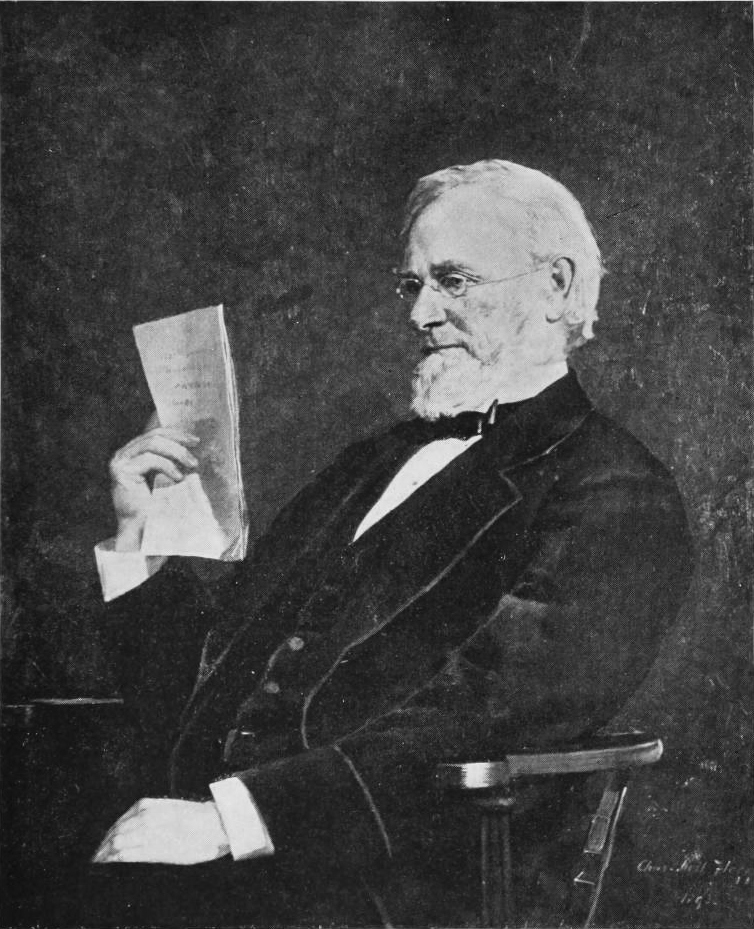
- Born: August 26, 1810; Coventry, Connecticut
- Died: May 2, 1889 (aged 78); Hartford, Connecticut
- Education: Yale College; Jefferson Medical College
- Spouse: Mary A. Crosby (after 1848)

Ebenezer Kingsbury Hunt (often called E. K. Hunt) (August 26, 1810 - May 2, 1889) was a medical doctor in Hartford, Connecticut.

== Early life ==
Ebenezer Kingsbury Hunt was born in Coventry, Connecticut. Hunt's parents were Dr. Eleazar Hunt (1786-1867) and Sybil (née Pomeroy) Hunt (1789-1876).

He was educated in the schools of Middletown, Connecticut and Amherst, Massachusetts and graduated from Yale College in 1833, where he was a member of the Linonian Society. He studied medicine at the Jefferson Medical College, Philadelphia, receiving his M.D. in 1838.

== Career ==
Hunt became a prominent physician in Hartford, President of the Connecticut State Medical Society in 1864 and 1865, director and medical visitor of the Connecticut Retreat for the Insane (now called The Institute of Living), and physician to the Asylum for the Deaf and Dumb (now called the American School for the Deaf).

== Personal life ==
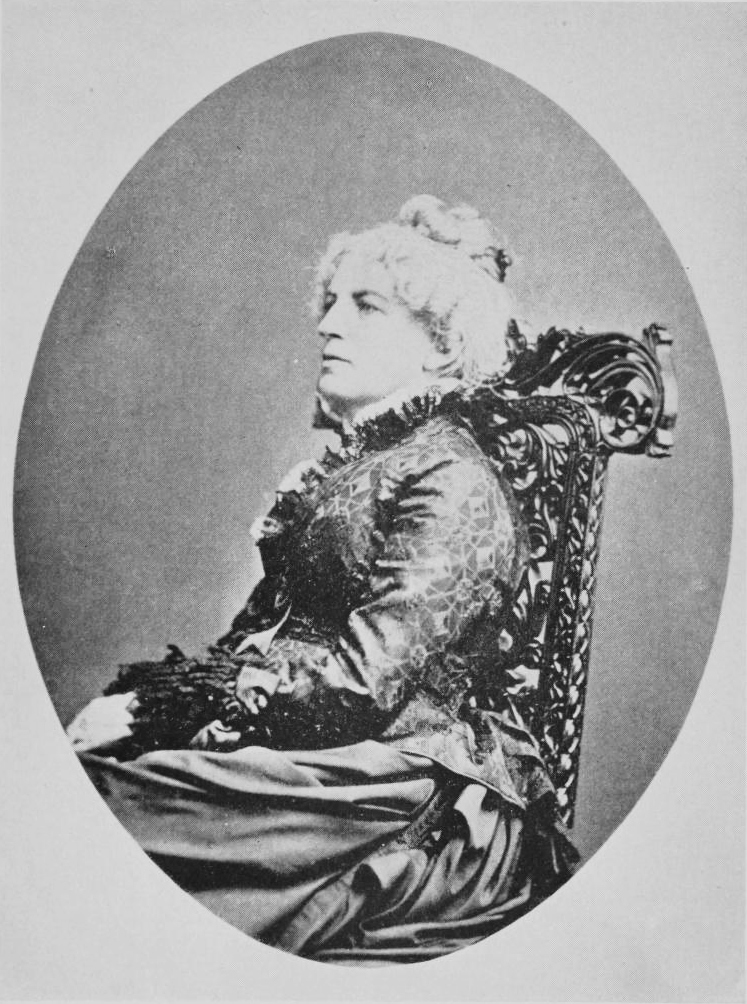
Hunt's wife, Mary Crosby Hunt.

On June 13, 1848, he married Mary A. Crosby (1826–1893), a daughter of Daniel P. Crosby of Hartford. Together, Ebenezer and Mary were the parents of four children, including:

- Louise Hunt, who married J. Benjamin Dimmick (1858–1920).
- Jeannette Hunt, who married George Goodwin Williams.
- Sarah Crosby Hunt (1849–1853), who died young.
- Mary Sibyl Hunt (1852–1855), who died young.

Hunt died in Hartford on May 2, 1889.

=== Legacy ===
The E. K. Hunt Chair (i.e., Professorship) of Anatomy at Yale University is named after him.

== Published works ==
- Hunt, Ebenezer Kingsbury; Goodrich, Chauncey Enoch (1858). A Biographical Sketch of Amariah Brigham, M.D., late superintendent of the New York State Lunatic Asylum, Utica, N.Y. Utica, New York: W. O. McClure. ISBN 978-0-7950-0780-4. Concerning the American psychiatrist Amariah Brigham
- Hunt, Ebenezer Kingsbury. Biographical sketch of George Sumner, M.D. (Sumner was Professor of Botany at Washington College in 1829 and President of the Connecticut State Medical Society in 1849)
- Esquirol, Étienne (1845) [1838 (original French edition)]. Mental maladies; a treatise on insanity. Translated from the French by Ebenezer Kingsbury Hunt. Philadelphia: Lea and Blanchard.
- Esquirol, Étienne (2011-05-23). Mental maladies; treatise on insanity. Translated from the French by Ebenezer Kingsbury Hunt. Charleston, South Carolina: Nabu Press. ISBN 978-1-172-76513-3. A reprint of the 1845 book.

== See also ==
- Psychiatric hospital
- History of psychiatric institutions
