= Vincenzo Miserendino =

Italian sculptor

Vincenzo "Vincent" Miserendino
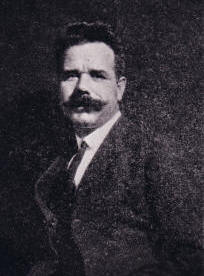
- Miserendino in 1906
- Born: January 29, 1875; Petralia Soprana, Sicily, Italy
- Died: December 26, 1943 (aged 68); New York City, United States
- Occupations: Artist; Sculptor
- Spouse: Julia Beninati (1904–43)

Vincenzo "Vincent" Miserendino (January 29, 1875 – December 26, 1943) was an Italian-American artist and sculptor born in Sicily and active in New York City during the first half of the 20th century. He studied art first in Palermo at the age of 13 and then in Rome at the Accademia di Belle Arti di Roma (Academy of Fine Arts at Rome). He immigrated to the United States in 1894 at the age of nineteen, and settled on the lower east side of Manhattan, working in many odd jobs while trying to establish himself as an artist.

Currently his sculptures can be found throughout the United States and many are catalogued in the Smithsonian Institution's Research Information Service.

== Prominent works ==
Miserendino became noted for his statues of Theodore Roosevelt and Franklin Delano Roosevelt.

In 1922 Miserendino created a larger-than-life terracotta sculpture of Roosevelt sitting on a rock in safari hunting attire, with a giant lion head beside his feet. In addition to Roosevelt as Hunter, he also made two other Roosevelt portraits (Oklahoma City, OK, 1907) and (A. B. Davis Middle School, Mount Vernon, New York, 1923).

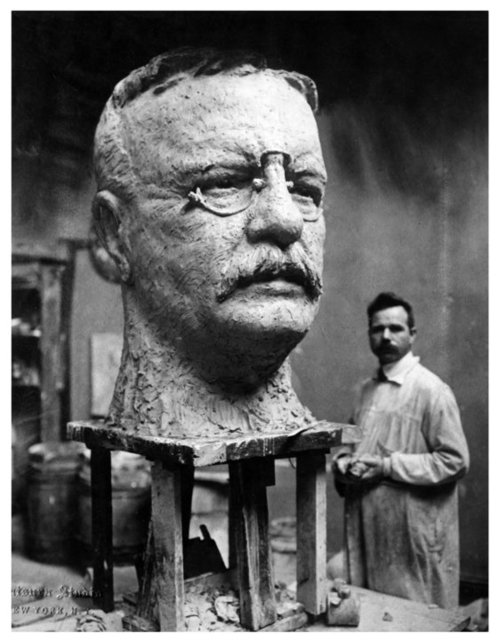
Vincenzo Miserendino working on one of his many Teddy Roosevelt portraits in his studio on the Bowery

Other prominent sculptures of Theodore Roosevelt are located in the Roosevelt Garden Apartments located at the Grand Concourse between 171st and 172nd Streets in Manhattan, in Roosevelt High School in Yonkers, New York and a Manhattan elementary school.

A sculpture of Franklin Delano Roosevelt was done in 1934, along with a sculpture of Franklin Roosevelt's mother Sara Delano Roosevelt. Both sculptures are now in the Franklin D. Roosevelt Presidential Library and Museum in Hyde Park, New York.

Miserendino did several statues of Christopher Columbus, one of which is an 8 1/2' bronze statue of Christopher Columbus mounted on a 10 1/2' foot marble pedestal in City Park, Reading, Pennsylvania. It was commissioned by the United Italian Societies of Reading and Berks County and was unveiled and dedicated on October 12, 1925. The statue was rededicated in 1992 for the 500th anniversary of the Columbus voyage to the New World. Another statue of Columbus is on the lawn of the Connecticut State Capitol. This statue was removed in 2020 due to the ongoing controversy on the legacy of Christopher Columbus and vandalization of other Columbus statues around the country.

In 1930, he sculpted a public monument of Thomas Mott Osborne, a prison reform leader, from bronze and granite for the department of parks and recreation in Auburn, NY.

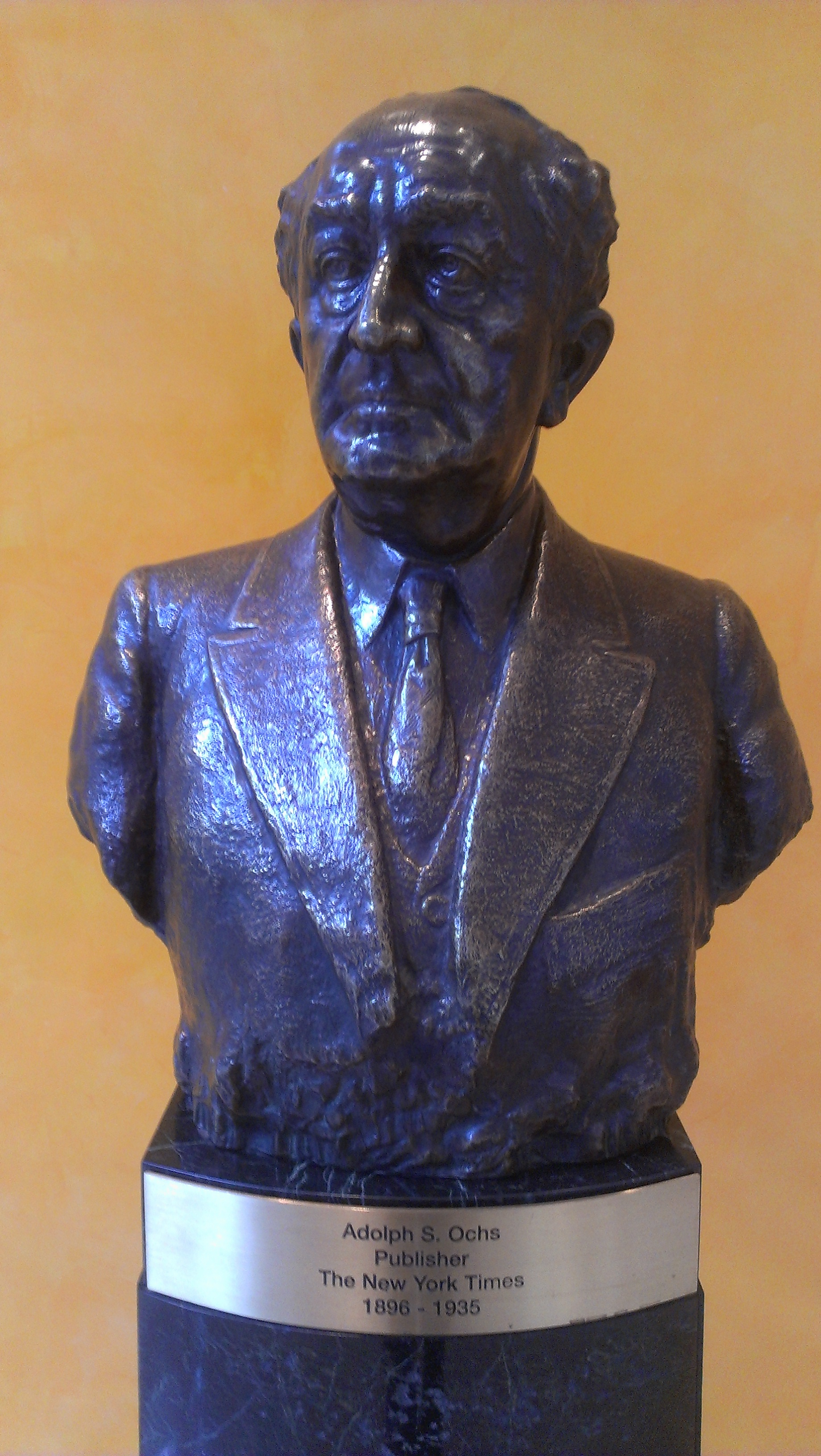
Bust of Adolph Ochs in Lobby of the New York Times

Adolph Ochs, the founder of the modern The New York Times, commissioned a bust of himself from Miserendino, which was completed in bronze and marble in 1933 in Long Island City, NY, and today is placed in the lobby of the modern New York Times Building on 40th Street and 8th Avenue in New York. The other bust of Ochs bust in bronze and wood and is in Oglethorpe, GA.

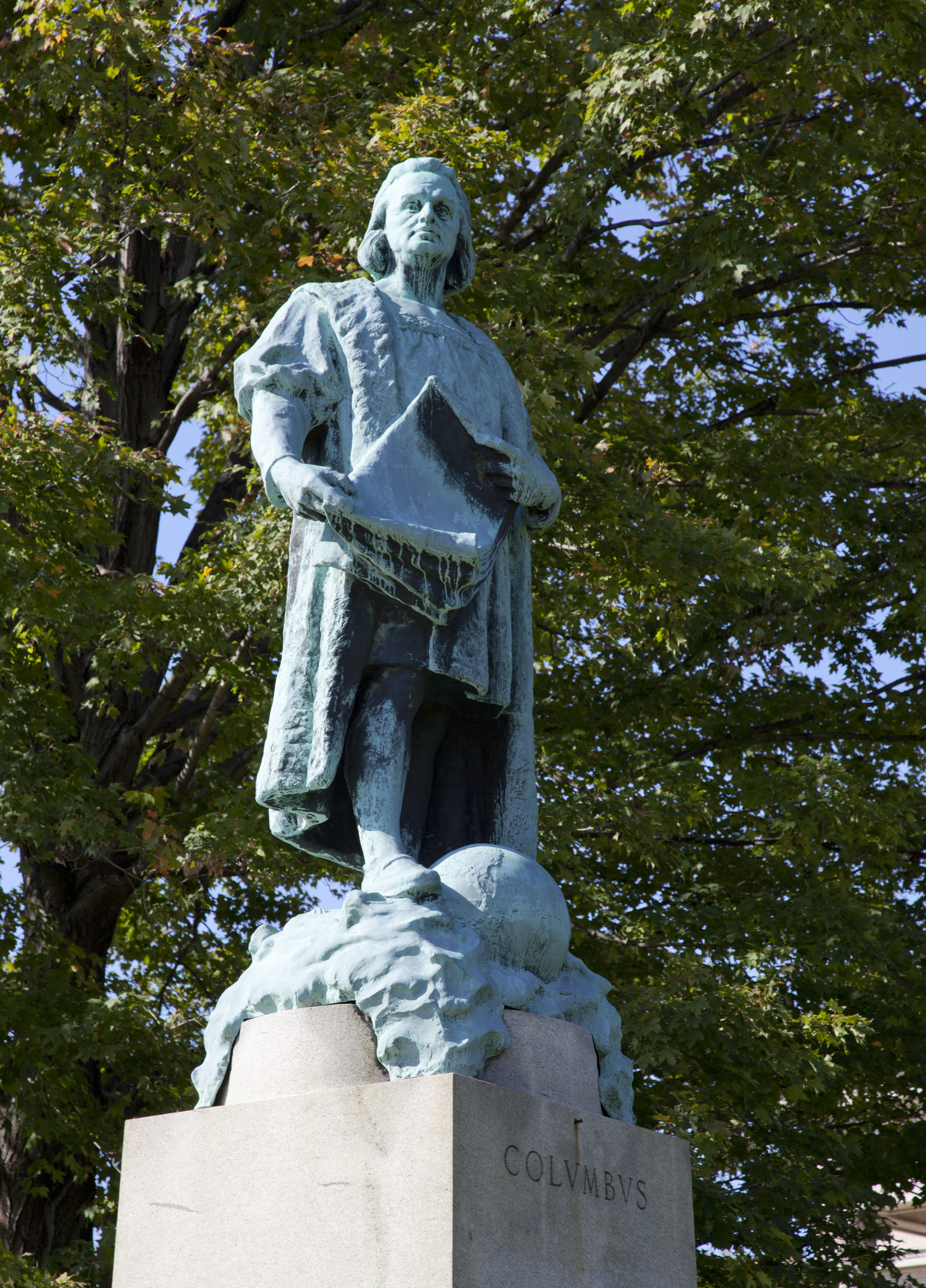
The Columbus statue in Hartford, Connecticut, near Bushnell Park was removed in June 2020

Other works include a busts of Admiral Richard E. Byrd, Enrico Caruso, Thomas Paine, and former Secretary of the Treasury (under Theodore Roosevelt) Leslie M. Shaw, Emerson, Daniel Frohman, Willy Pogany, J. L. Holftrup, Edward F. Albee, and Betalo Rubino among numerous others.

Miseredino was also able to sell watercolors, paintings and murals, such as "The Spring Dance" to the Palais Royal on Broadway, an early motion picture house in New York City, for their lobby, as chronicled on April 17, 1917, in American Art News.

Miserendino's last and largest statue of Theodore Roosevelt, which was eight times life-size was commissioned in 1941, and scheduled to be placed in Boone, Iowa in 1943. However, at the time of casting, it had its 4,000 pounds of bronze appropriated for the World War II war effort. Miserendino commented at the time that Theodore Roosevelt himself would have approved of that decision to put the service of the country first.

The monument was finally cast in 1946 (after Miserendino's death) by the Roman Bronze Corporation of Corona, N.Y. It arrived in Boone in November 1946 and put into place on January 6, 1948. The statue depicts Roosevelt rising out of a mountainous landscape with his hand outstretched as if addressing a crowd. Ten bas reliefs of Roosevelt's outdoor accomplishments are depicted below his figure.

== Prominent shows ==
Miserendino showed his work several times at the New York Academy of Design and the Philadelphia Academy of Fine Arts.

In the 1920s, Miserendino had a show at the Tiffany Studios of watercolors and sculptures, which had been organized by Louis C. Tiffany.

== Personal life ==
Miserendino was married to Julia Beninati from 1904 until 1943 (his death). He had six children, Joseph, Vivian, Eleanor, Isabel, Cecelia, and Theodore (named after Roosevelt). He spent the majority of his married life in the Pelham Bay section of the Bronx, and commuted to his studio on the Lower East Side of Manhattan.

Miserendino was well enough known in his own day to be mentioned in the book Peregrina: Love and Death in Mexico by Alma M. Reed.

Miserendino himself published a book, "Art in Its Making and the Law of Success" in 1923.

He died of a heart attack in 1943 and is buried in the Saint Raymond's Cemetery in the Bronx, New York.

== List of significant works ==
=== Public Monuments ===
- Christopher Columbus, "Columbus is in the attitude of speaking to the royals of Spain...with Four Bronze Tablets Decorating the Pedestal: Columbus Sails for the West Indies; The Old and the New Worlds Meet; Columbus Meeting the Natives; The King, the Nina, the Pinta, the Santa Maria." Penn's Common (City Park) Reading Pennsylvania, Dedicated, 1925, Donor United Italian Societies of Reading and Berks County, Pa., Statue refurbished in 1992
- Christopher Columbus, "Admiral of the Ocean Seas", Near Capitol Building, Columbus Green, Hartford, Connecticut, Dedicated 1926; removed 2020
- Theodore Roosevelt, "The Orator", A.B. Davis Middle School, Mount Vernon, NY
- Bishop Mathias Loras, First Roman Catholic Bishop of Dubuque, Founder of Loras College, Loras College, Dubuque, Iowa, Dedicated 1939
- Thomas Mott Osborne, Manufacturer, Newspaper Publisher, Auburn, N.Y., Prison Reformer (Warden of Sing Sing Prison, Ossining, NY, 1914–1916) Author of Three Books on Prison Reform. Originally (1930) in Sing Sing Prison, now Administered by City of Auburn, N.Y.
- Theodore Roosevelt, Fountain of Strength was at 172nd Street, Grand Concourse, Bronx, N.Y. Unknown location at present.
- The Spirit of Mercury

=== Portrait Busts, Heads and Small Statues of Prominent Individuals ===
==== Political Figures And Government Officials (Men) ====
- Theodore Roosevelt, Bronze. Small Sculpture of "The Orator" also in Theodore Roosevelt Birthplace, National Historic Site, 28 E. 20th St., NYC
- Theodore Roosevelt, Bronze Head, Dedicated, 1920, Steele Memorial Library, Elmira, N.Y.
- Theodore Roosevelt, Bronze Head, 1907, Oklahoma Historical Society, Oklahoma City, Oklahoma
- Theodore Roosevelt, Small standing plaster cast
- Franklin D. Roosevelt, Bronze Head, 1934, Franklin D. Roosevelt Library and Museum, Hyde Park, New York
- Leslie Mortier Shaw, Governor of Iowa, Ex-Secretary of the Treasury, mentioned in "Vincenzo Miserendino...Sculptor"
- Judge Ben B. Lindsey, Denver Colorado, Advocate for Child Offenders

==== Other Prominent Public Figures (Men) ====
- Most Rev. Francis J.L. Beckman, S.T.D., Roman Catholic Archbishop of Dubuque, Iowa
- Rear Admiral Richard E. Byrd, Aviator, Arctic, Antarctic Explorer, Virginia
- Carl Linnaeus, Swedish Naturalist, Possibly a Bronze of the 18th Century "Father of Taxonomy" in Bronx or Brooklyn, NY Botanical Gardens
- Levi Walter Mengel, teacher, Naturalist, Collector of Specimens, Director and Benefactor of the Reading Public Museum, Reading, Pa., Bronze Bust, Reading Public Museum and Art Gallery, Reading, Pennsylvania
- Adolph Ochs, publisher, The New York Times, 1896–1935 Bronze Bust, 1933, The New York Times Building, 8th Avenue, between 40th and 41st Streets,
- Adolph Ochs, publisher, The New York Times, 1896–1935, Bronze Bust, 1933, Administered by City of New York, Board of Education, Public Art for Public Schools, Long Island City, New York
- Adolph Ochs, publisher, The New York Times, 1896–1935, Bronze Bust, 1933, Administered by US Dept. of Interior, National Park Service, Washington, DC., Administered by Chickamauga and Chattanooga National Military Park, Ft. Oglethorpe, Georgia, Located, Chickamauga and Chattanooga National Military Park, Ft. Oglethorpe, Georgia
- John William Potter, Founder, Rock Island Argus, Rock Island, Illinois

==== Other Prominent Public Figures in the Arts and Literature (Men) ====
- Enrico Caruso, Tenor
- Irvin S. Cobb, Author and Humorist, New York
- Bob Davis, Editor and Author (Possibly Robert Hobart Davis, 1869–1942, Editor and writer, Harper's Magazine)
- Daniel Frohman, Theatrical and Film Producer, New York
- Beniamino Gigli, Tenor, White Marble Bust, Museo Gigli, Municipio di Recanati, Provincia Di Macerata, Italia
- Thomas Paine, 18th Century, American Intellectual, Author of "Common Sense."

==== Prominent Women ====
- Eleanora Duse, Late 19th, Early 20th Century Italian Actress, 1858–1924, innovator of acting technique and in 1923 the first woman ever to be featured on the cover of Time magazine
- Dr. Jennie McCowan, Davenport, Iowa teacher, then one of the first women medical graduates of Univ. of Iowa, (1876) practitioner and community activist for many humanitarian causes including women's and children's issues and the care of institutionalized persons
- Alma Reed, 1889–1966, Early woman journalist, author, friend of Mexico, social activist in California and Mexico. See photo of Vincenzo with his bronze of Reed in "Brooklyn Standard Union," November 30, 1924, also in Reed's autobiography, Peregrina: Love and Death in Mexico. Austin: University of Texas Press, 2007
- Sara Delano Roosevelt, 1854–1941, Mother of President Franklin Delano Roosevelt Bronze Head, 1934, Franklin D. Roosevelt Library and Museum, Hyde Park, New York
