= Statue of Israel Putnam =

Statue in Bushnell Park, Connecticut, US

General Israel Putnam
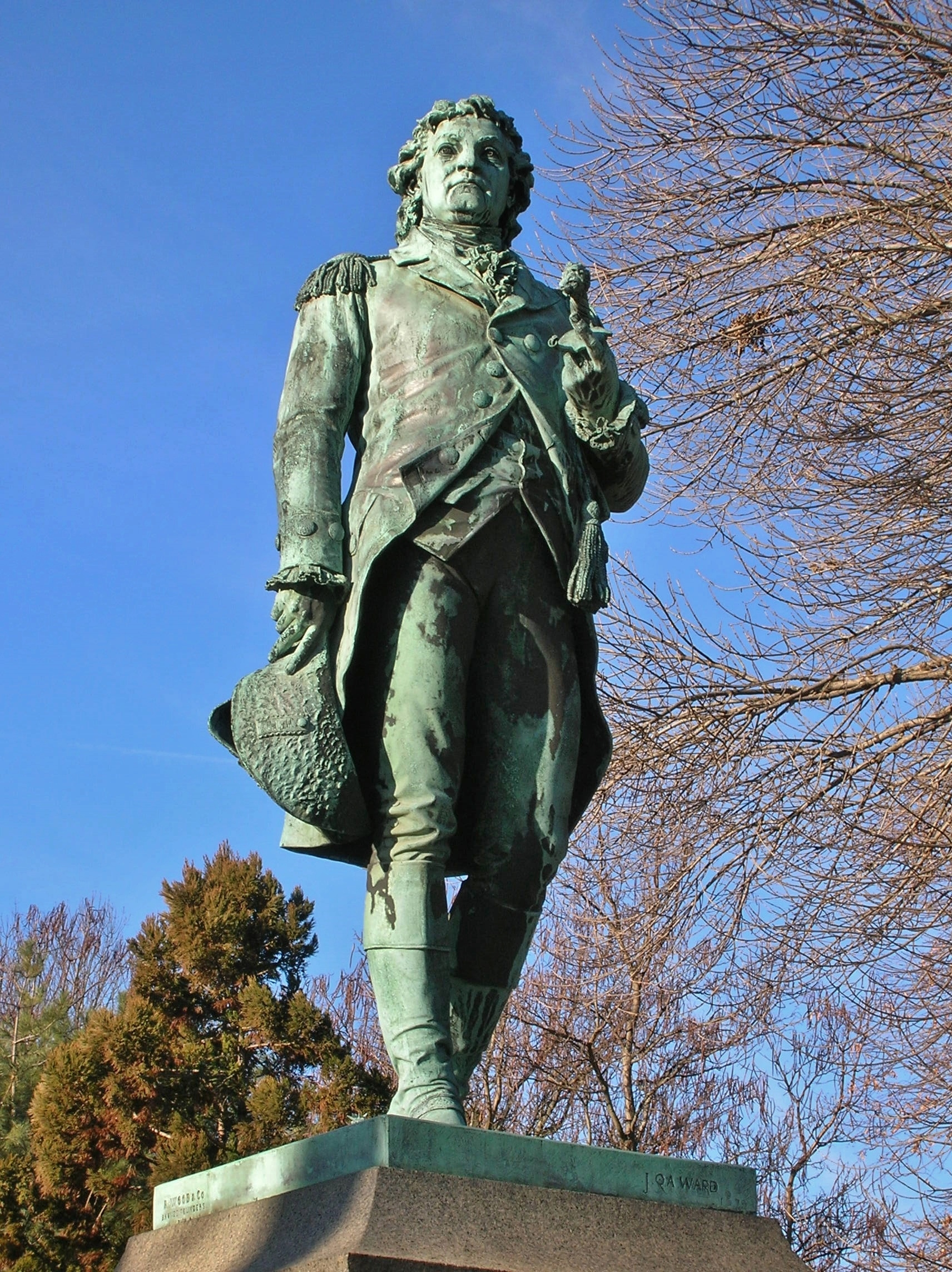
- The statue in 2016
- Location: Bushnell Park, Hartford, Connecticut, United States
- Coordinates: 41°45′54.5″N 72°40′50.5″W
- Designer: John Quincy Adams Ward (sculptor); R. M. Hunt (architect)
- Fabricator: Robert Wood & Company
- Type: Statue
- Material: Bronze; Granite
- Length: 5 feet (1.5 m)
- Width: 4 feet (1.2 m)
- Height: 17 feet (5.2 m)
- Beginning date: 1872 or 1873
- Completion date: 1873
- Dedicated date: June 17, 1874
- Dedicated to: Israel Putnam

General Israel Putnam is a monumental statue in Hartford, Connecticut, United States. Located in the city's Bushnell Park, the statue was designed by sculptor John Quincy Adams Ward and honors Israel Putnam, a military officer in the Continental Army during the American Revolutionary War. The statue was largely paid for by a donation from judge Joseph P. Allyn and was dedicated in a large ceremony in 1874. It was one of the first statues to be erected in the park, which nowadays houses several other monuments to famous Connecticut residents. From an artistic standpoint, the statue has received mixed reviews from critics.

== History ==
Israel Putnam was a military officer who served as a major general in the Continental Army during the American Revolutionary War. Born in Salem, Massachusetts in 1718, he moved to Connecticut in 1739 and died there in 1790, having become a folk hero in the state.

In 1869, Joseph P. Allyn, a judge from the state capital of Hartford, Connecticut, died. In his will he allocated US$5,000 to his father and two other men for the purposes of erecting a monument in honor of Putnam in Hartford's Bushnell Park. His father added an additional $5,000 of his own money and, in either 1872 or 1873, the trustees chose to commission sculptor John Quincy Adams Ward to design a statue of Putnam. The statue would be the first of six Revolutionary War sculptures Ward would create during his lifetime. R. M. Hunt of New York City designed an accompanying pedestal for the statue, which cost about $2,000 and was paid for by the city government of Hartford. Ultimately, the monument cost a total of at least $14,000. (Note: Sources are slightly unclear on the exact cost. According to the Smithsonian Institution Research Information System, the "sculpture cost $14,000", while an 1895 article in The Connecticut Quarterly stated that the sculpture cost $12,000, with the pedestal costing an additional $2,000.) Ward completed the sculpture in 1873 while he was also working on some sculptures for the Connecticut State Capitol, located near Bushnell Park. Casting was performed by the Robert Wood & Company foundry in Philadelphia.

The monument was dedicated on June 17, 1874, in a large ceremony at the park. The dedication took place on the anniversary of the Battle of Bunker Hill (a Revolutionary War battle in which Putnam participated almost 100 years prior) and occurred during a wave of monument-building in the United States that honored both Revolutionary and Civil War-era figures. The statue would be one of the first to be erected in the park, coming several years after the erection of the first statue in the park, one of Bishop Thomas Church Brownell, in 1869.

In 1993, the monument was surveyed as part of the Save Outdoor Sculpture! project.

== Design ==
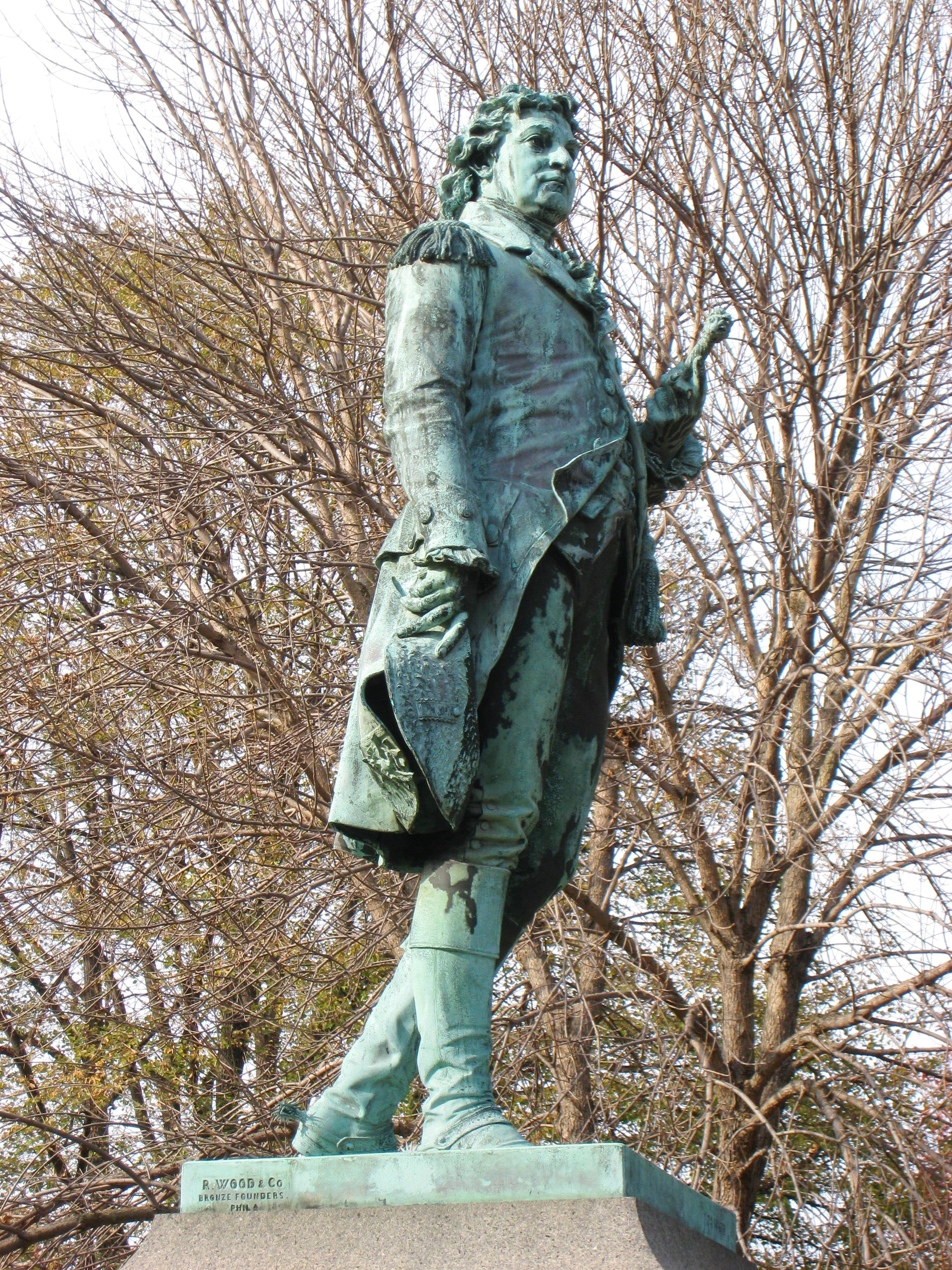
Sideview of the sculpture

The monument consists of a bronze statue of Putnam, standing 7 feet (2.1 m) tall, (Note: A height of 7 feet (2.1 m) is given by the Smithsonian Institution Research Information System. However, several other sources give a height of approximately 8 feet (2.4 m).) atop a granite pedestal standing 10 feet (3.0 m) tall. The sculpture has side dimensions of approximately 2.5 feet (0.76 m) by 1.5 feet (0.46 m), while the rectangular pedestal has side measurements of 5 feet (1.5 m) by 4 feet (1.2 m). Putnam is dressed in his military garb from the Revolutionary War, including a frock coat and cravat, and is depicted in midstride. He is holding a sword by his side with his left hand, while his relaxed right hand holds onto a tricorne. According to an 1874 article in The Aldine, Ward modeled Putnam's face off of an ink portrait belonging to his descendants and a portrait created by John Trumbull. The base of the sculpture bears markings from the designer and foundry (J.Q.A. WARD / 1873 / R. WOOD & CO / BRONZE FOUNDERS. / PHILA.), while the front of the pedestal reads "ISRAEL PUTNAM" and the back bears the inscription "PRESENTED / BY THE HONOURABLE / JOSEPH PRATT ALLYN / MDCCCLXXIII".

=== Analysis ===
Contemporary reviews of the statue were generally mixed. An 1888 article by T. H. Bartlett in The American Architect and Building News states that the public was disappointed in Ward's portrayal of Putnam, saying, "Artists, as well as the public, have criticized, justly, the position and character of the statue." However, a 1903 article by Amanda M. Flattery in The Bay View Magazine lists the statue among several other examples of Ward's "genius", including his equestrian statue of George Henry Thomas and statue of George Washington. The Bushnell Park Foundation, which oversees the park and administers the statue, observe that "[i]n Ward’s rendering of Putnam taking a step forward, he is no longer a static figure but a candid portrayal of a fleeting moment as the general strides forth", which lends "a more natural, spontaneous character and heightened the realism of his sculpture". They proceed to note that while the monument is "a radical departure from his work in the post-Civil War period, this statue marks a new and important dimension in his work".

== Sources ==
- Adams, Sherman W. (April–June 1895). "The Hartford Park System". The Connecticut Quarterly. 1 (2): 173–179.
- Bartlett, T. H. (June 16, 1888). "Some American Monuments – IV". The American Architect and Building News. XXIII (651). Ticknor & Company: 279–282. ISSN 2155-3971. OCLC 8696571.
- Flattery, Amanda M. (March 1903). "Some Representative American Sculptors". The Bay View Magazine. 10 (5): 275–292.
