= The Pilgrim (statue) =

Sculpture in Central Park, New York City

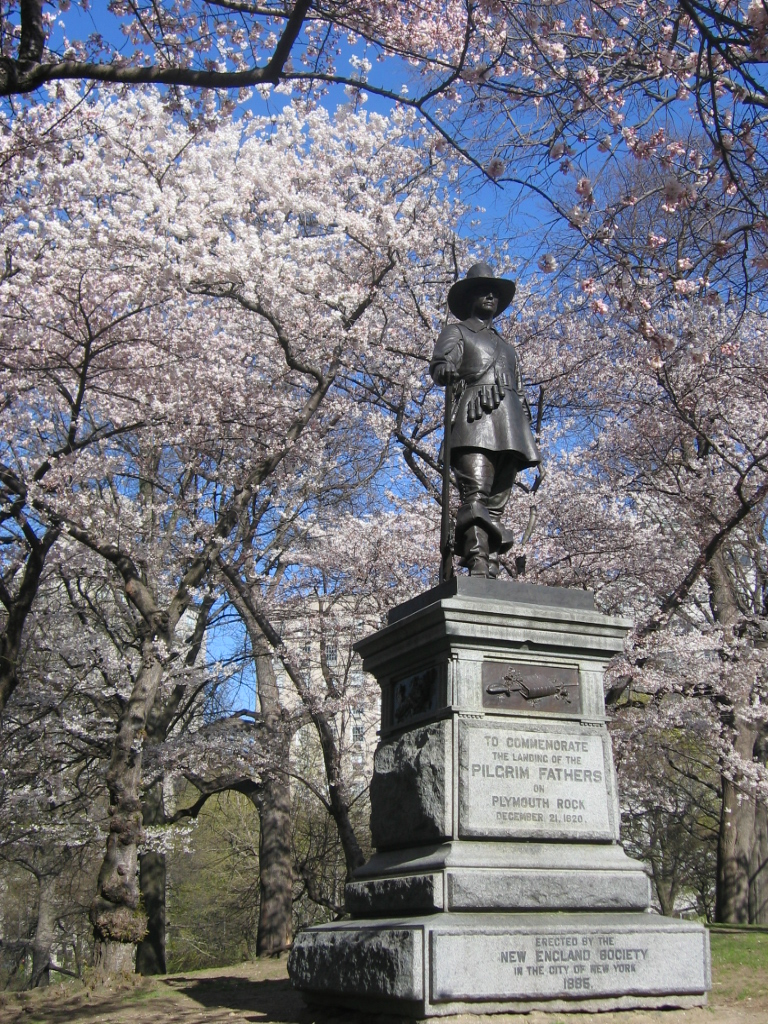
- The monument in 2005
- Interactive map of The Pilgrim
- Location: Central Park, New York City, New York, United States
- Coordinates: 40°46′23″N 73°58′6.5″W
- Designer: John Quincy Adams Ward (sculptor); Richard Morris Hunt (architect)
- Builder: Henry-Bonnard Bronze Company (statue); Hallowell Granite Company (pedestal)
- Type: Statue
- Material: Bronze (statue and panels); Granite (pedestal)
- Length: 73 inches (190 cm)
- Width: 73 inches (190 cm)
- Height: 16.5 feet (5.0 m)
- Completion date: 1884
- Dedicated date: June 6, 1885
- Restored date: 1979; 1999
- Dedicated to: the Pilgrims of Plymouth Colony

The Pilgrim is a monument in New York City's Central Park, near the park entrance at East 72nd Street. The monument, which depicts a Pilgrim from the Plymouth Colony, was commissioned by the New England Society in commemoration of their 75th anniversary and was dedicated in 1885. It consists of a bronze statue designed by sculptor John Quincy Adams Ward and a granite pedestal designed by architect Richard Morris Hunt, with casting performed by the Henry-Bonnard Bronze Company and construction of the pedestal performed by the Hallowell Granite Company. The statue has received generally poor reviews from critics, who have criticized the statue as emphasizing the subject's dress over his personality or character. Several reviewers have unfavorably compared the work to The Puritan, a later statue of a similar subject by Augustus Saint-Gaudens.

== History ==
=== Background and creation ===
The idea for the monument originated at the 73rd annual meeting of the New England Society on December 11, 1878. During the meeting, Daniel F. Appleton said of a potential monument, "A statue of one of the Pilgrim Fathers of Plymouth, or of one of the Puritans of Massachusetts Bay—some typical historical personage of the earliest period of either of those colonies—would be the most acceptable and convenient form of the monument." This monument would serve as part of the society's 75th anniversary celebrations. Sculptor John Quincy Adams Ward was selected to create the sculpture, with the pedestal being designed by architect Richard Morris Hunt. The statue was cast by the Henry-Bonnard Bronze Company, while the pedestal was constructed by the Hallowell Granite Company. Funding for the project came from the society.

The sculpture was one of the first major projects he worked on following a move to a new studio on 52nd Street in Manhattan, and one of two statues he completed during the mid-1880s, alongside a statue of the Marquis de Lafayette that was erected in Burlington, Vermont. However, historical documentation concerning his commissioning for the project and his work on the statue is scant. Ward completed work on the sculpture in 1884. In October of that year, the Henry-Bonnard Bronze Company hosted an exhibition that featured the statue alongside several others that the foundry had recently cast, which included a statue of John Harvard and a statue of Samuel Francis Du Pont. The statue was one of the most famous created by the company and, until the end of the 19th century, it would be prominently featured in the foundry's letterhead.

=== Dedication and later history ===
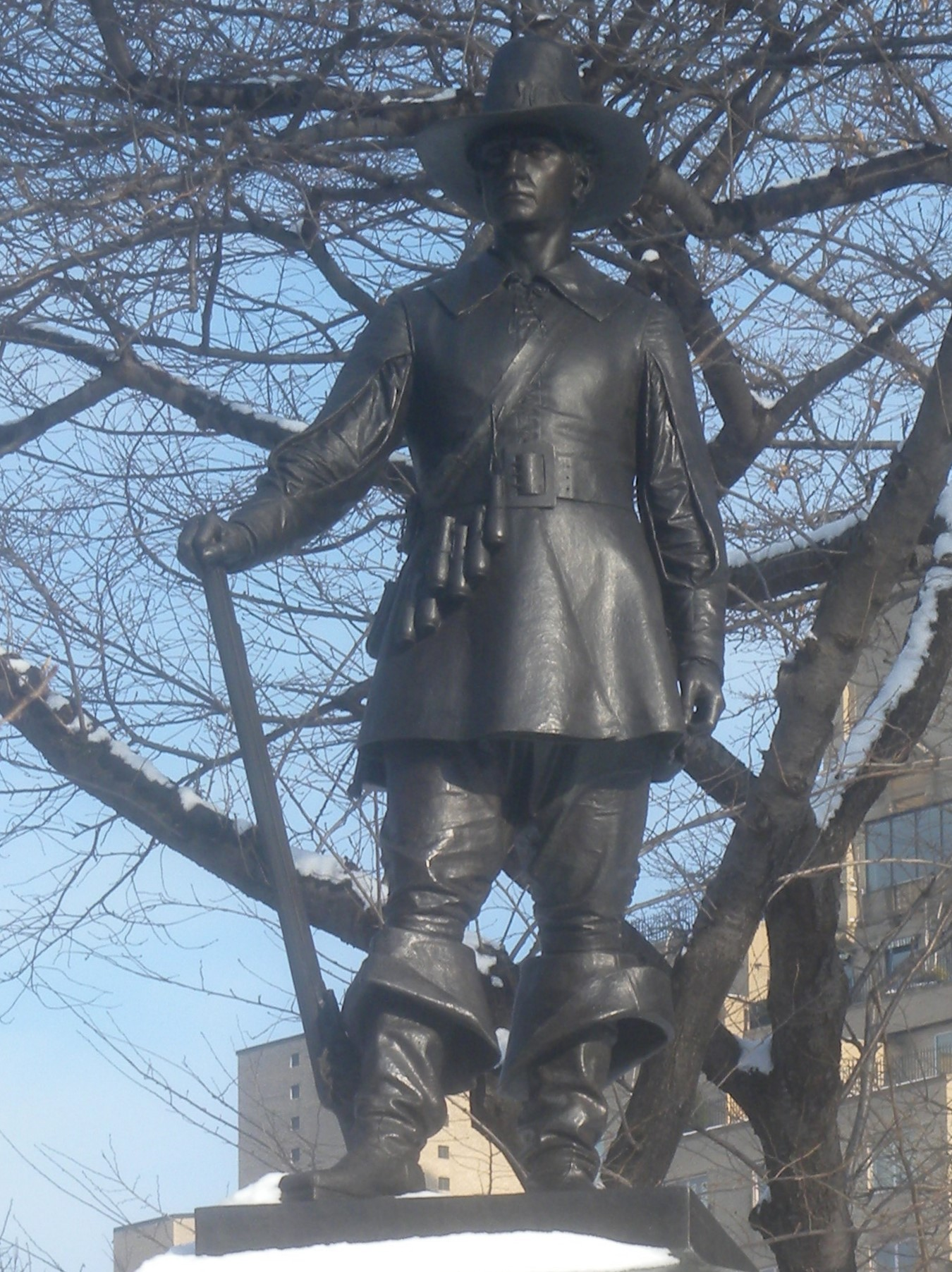
Closeup of the sculpture, pictured 2011

The monument was dedicated on June 6, 1885, in Central Park. The statue was the fourth and final work by Ward to be erected in the park, and according to the Central Park Conservancy, it is his most well-known. In 1979, the monument was one of the first pieces of public art in the park to undergo a restoration process as part of a project by the conservancy to repair its statuary. In 1993, it was surveyed as part of the Save Outdoor Sculpture! program. Six years later, parts of the sculpture were recast and replaced. It is administered by the government of New York City.

=== Other versions ===
A plaster cast of the statue was acquired by the Art Institute of Chicago. In 1912, it was reported that it was on display alongside a plaster cast of The Puritan by Augustus Saint-Gaudens, though by 1985, the cast was no longer in existence. In 1915, a sketch of the statue was displayed at the Panama–Pacific International Exposition. A bronze statuette of the sculpture probably existed, as evidenced by correspondences between Ward's widow and the American Academy of Arts and Letters, though the location of this statuette today is unknown.

== Design and location ==
The monument consists of a bronze statue of a man standing atop a granite pedestal. The statue is approximately 9 feet (2.7 meters) in height and has a square base measuring 32 inches (81 centimeters) on either side. Meanwhile, the pedestal, which is rusticated, has a height of about 90 in (230 cm) and has a square base with sides measuring 73 in (190 cm). The man is dressed in the clothing typical of a Pilgrim and is holding a flintlock musket. Markings near the base of the sculpture list the sculptor, the foundry, and the year of the statue's creation (J.Q.A. WARD / SCULPTOR 1884 / THE HENRY-BONNARD BRONZE CO. / NEW YORK 1884). Attached to the four sides of the pedestal are bronze panels showing images, in bas relief, of the Mayflower, a crossbow and arrows, the Bible and a sword, and a depiction of commerce. On the front of the pedestal is the following text:

TO COMMEMORATE / THE LANDING OF THE / PILGRIM FATHERS / ON / PLYMOUTH ROCK / DECEMBER 21, 1620 / ERECTED BY THE / NEW ENGLAND SOCIETY / IN THE CITY OF NEW YORK / 1885

The monument is located on a hill on the east side of the park, near the entrance at East 72nd Street. The pilgrim faces westward, in the direction of the statue of Daniel Webster that is also on display in the park.

=== Analysis ===
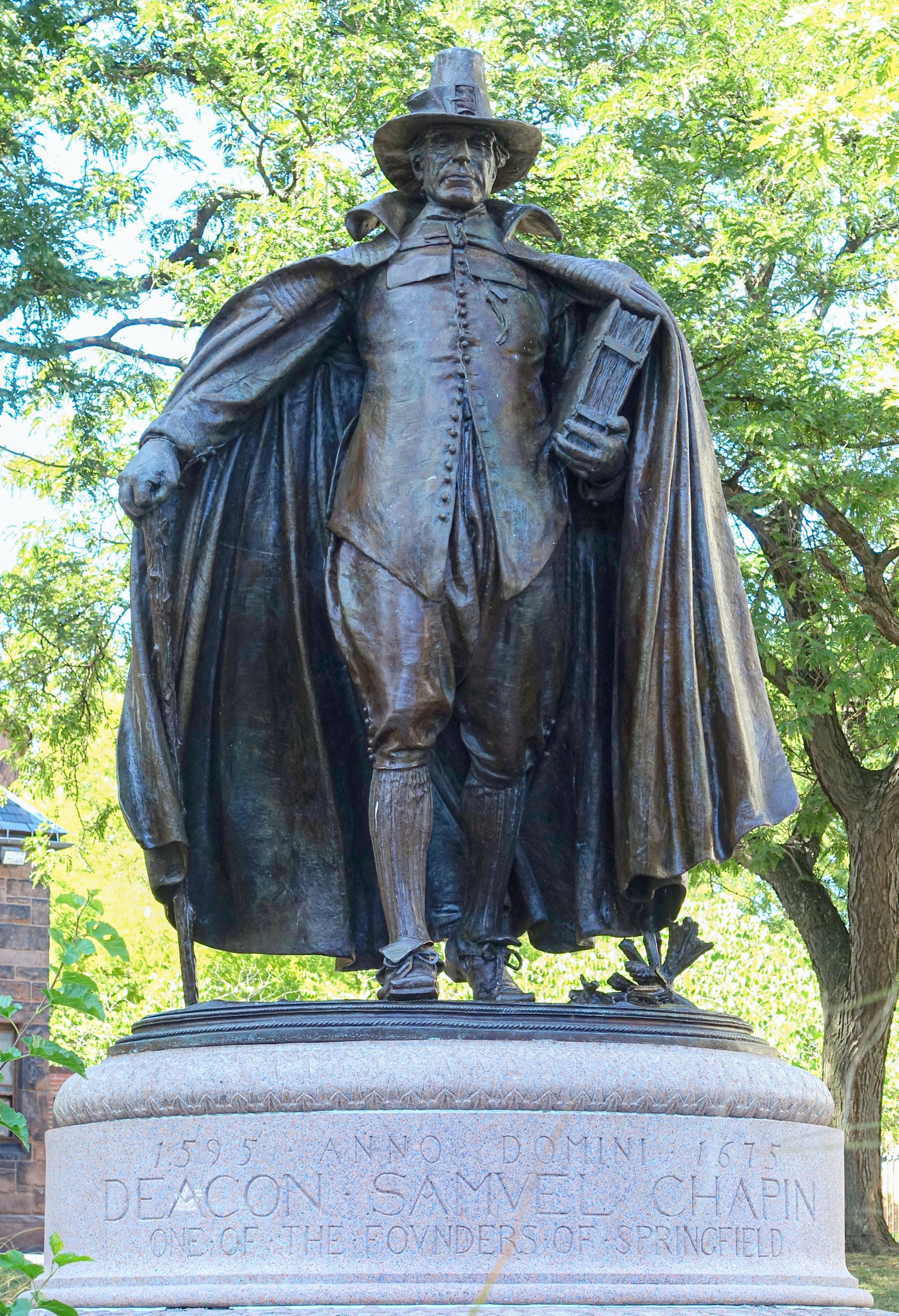
Several reviewers have compared the statue to The Puritan (pictured 2015), a later sculpture designed by Augustus Saint-Gaudens.

Artistic reception to the statue was fairly poor. In a review of the piece, art critic Russell Sturgis stated that there had been too much emphasis on the clothing of the figure and not enough of a focus on the characterization. A similar sentiment was echoed in 1968 by art historian E. Wayne Craven, who said that "Ward placed too much emphasis on the costume, thereby detracting from the personality of the figure as a whole". In a 1988 book by Margot Gayle and Michele Cohen, the authors wrote that the statue depicted "a figure historically accurate in its details yet one that fails to express a state of mind", further calling the work "more of a costume piece than an embodiment of a character".

Several reviewers compared the statue unfavorably to The Puritan, a later work by Saint-Gaudens. In 1985, art curator Lewis I. Sharp wrote that Ward's work "shows that he lacked Saint-Gaudens's ability to convert an abstract idea into three-dimensional form. The Pilgrim, in contrast to Saint-Gaudens's Puritan, is a picturesque costume piece that conveys little of the deep religious beliefs and personal determination of the colonists who settled Massachusetts." Similarly, Craven compared the statue to one of John Harvard at Harvard University, arguing Ward's statue focused too much on the dress and not on the personality, as the Harvard statue did.

== See also ==
- Public art in Central Park

== Sources ==
- Adams, Adeline (1912). John Quincy Adams Ward: An Appreciation. New York City: National Sculpture Society. OCLC 218030.
- "The Pilgrim". Central Park Conservancy. Archived from the original on October 22, 2020.
- Craven, Wayne (1968). Sculpture in America. New York City: Thomas Y. Crowell Co. ISBN 978-0-690-72240-6. OCLC 513236.
- Fried, Frederick (1976). New York Civic Sculpture: A Pictorial Guide. Photographs by Edmund V. Gillon Jr. New York City: Dover Publications. ISBN 978-0-486-23258-4. OCLC 2164565.
- Gayle, Margot; Cohen, Michele (1988). The Art Commission and the Municipal Art Society Guide to Manhattan's Outdoor Sculpture. Foreword by Edward I. Koch. New York City: Prentice Hall Press. ISBN 978-0-13-620253-0. OCLC 17508421.
- Miller, Sara Cedar (2003). Central Park: An American Masterpiece. Published in association with the Central Park Conservancy. New York City: Harry N. Abrams. ISBN 978-0-8109-3946-2. OCLC 50773395.
- "Central Park Monuments - Pilgrim". New York City Department of Parks and Recreation. Archived from the original on July 27, 2015.
- Shapiro, Michael Edward (1985). Bronze Casting and American Sculpture, 1850–1900. American Arts Series. Newark, Delaware: University of Delaware Press. ISBN 978-0-87413-218-2. OCLC 10484378.
- Sharp, Lewis I.; Kiehl, David W. (June 18, 1974). New York City Public Sculpture by 19th-Century American Artists. New York City: Metropolitan Museum of Art.
- Sharp, Lewis I. (1985). John Quincy Adams Ward: Dean of American Sculpture. Newark, Delaware: University of Delaware Press. ISBN 978-0-87413-253-3. OCLC 10849454.
- "The Pilgrim, (sculpture)". Smithsonian Institution Research Information System. Archived from the original on March 27, 2026.
