= John Quincy Adams Ward =

American sculptor (1830–1910)

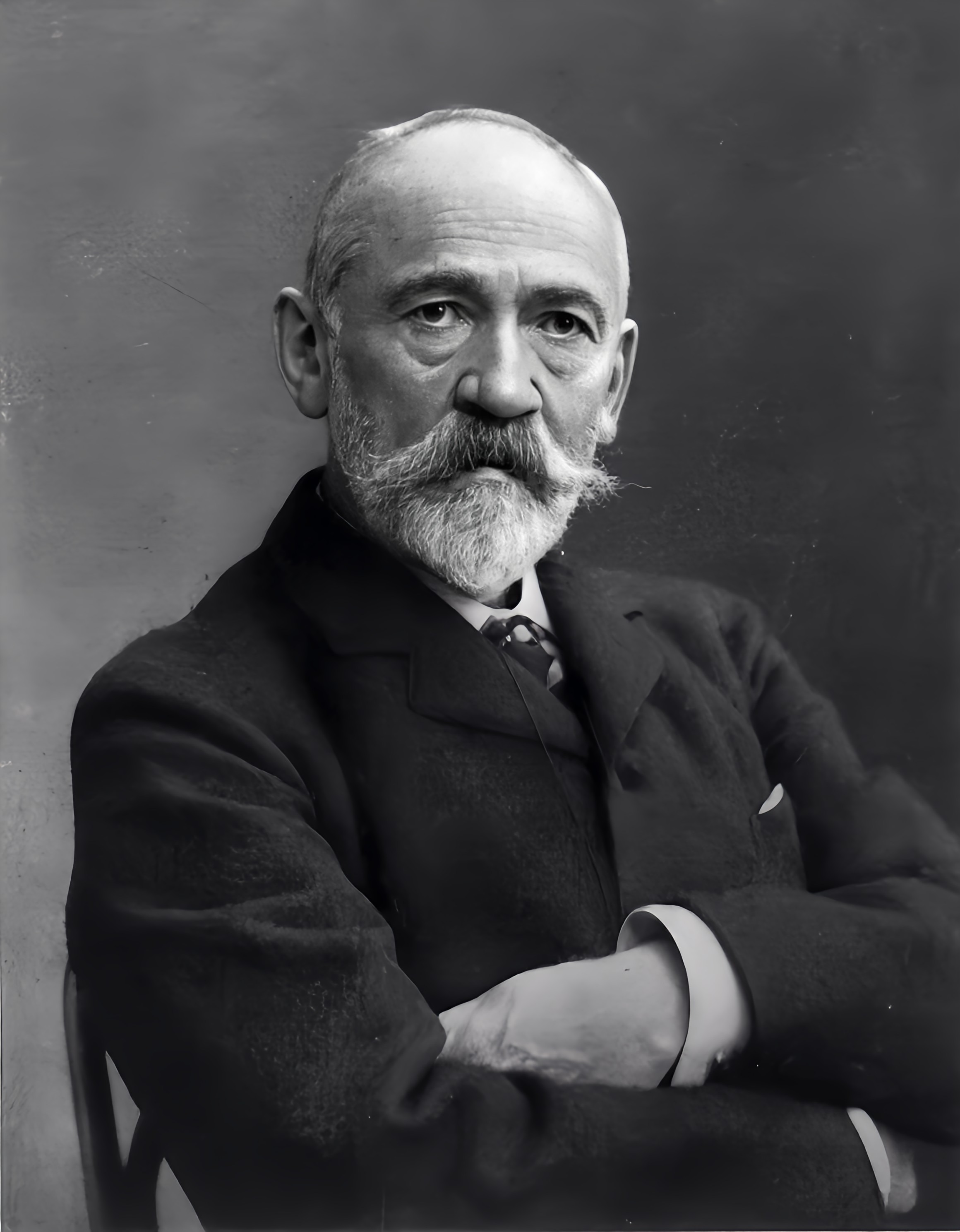
- John Quincy Adams Ward, ca. 1900
- Born: June 29, 1830; Urbana, Ohio, US
- Died: May 1, 1910 (aged 79); New York City, US
- Known for: Sculpture

John Quincy Adams Ward (June 29, 1830 – May 1, 1910) was an American sculptor, whose most familiar work is his larger than life-size standing statue of George Washington on the steps of Federal Hall National Memorial in New York City.

== Early years ==
Ward was the fourth of eight children born to John Anderson Ward and Eleanor Macbeth in Urbana, Ohio, a city founded by his paternal grandfather Colonel William Ward. One of his younger brothers was the artist Edgar Melville Ward. The family lived on William Ward's homestead and 600 acres of land after he died. Growing up, Ward liked to spend his time by the creek-bed fashioning mud into small figures and animals. Ward's interest in three dimensional forms was encouraged by a neighbor and local potter, Miles Chatfield. At the age of 11, Chatfield allowed Ward to have the run of his studio and taught him how to throw a pot and decorate it with bas-reliefs. Ward spent several years working on his family farm, and after seeing a sculpture exhibition in Cincinnati in 1847, felt discouraged from pursuing an artistic career. His family proposed he study medicine, but after contracting malaria, he had to abandon his studies.

Ward later lived with his older sister Eliza and her husband Jonathan Wheelock Thomas in Brooklyn, New York, where he trained for seven years (1849 to 1856) under the well-established sculptor Henry Kirke Brown, who carved "J.Q.A. Ward, asst." on his equestrian monument of George Washington in Union Square. Ward went to Washington in 1857, where he made a name for himself with portrait busts of men in public life. In 1861, he worked for the Ames Manufacturing Company of Chicopee, Massachusetts, providing models for decorative objects including gilt-bronze sword hilts for the Union Army. Ames was one of the largest brass, bronze and iron foundries in the United States.

Ward set up a studio in New York City in 1861 and was elected to the National Academy of Design the following year; he was their president until 1874. In 1882, a new New York home and studio on 52nd Street was designed for him by his friend Richard Morris Hunt, who was to collaborate with him on many projects over the years.

Ward was dedicated to developing an American school of sculpture through his participation in organizations and teaching. He occasionally took on students and assistants, the most notable being Daniel Chester French, Jules Desbois, Francois J. Rey, and Charles Albert Lopez. In 1888–1889, Ward, along with his studio assistant Francois J. Rey and a man named W. Hunt, taught a sculpture class at The Metropolitan Museum of Art. Four years later, he was invited by Harvard University to give a series of lectures.

Ward was married three times. He married his first wife, Anna Bannan, on February 10, 1858. After her death, he married Julia Devens Valentine on June 19, 1877. Julia died during childbirth on January 31, 1879.

== Career ==
Nineteenth-century American commissions for sculpture were largely confined to portrait busts and monuments, where Ward was preeminent in his generation. Sculptors also made a living selling bronze reductions of their public works; Ward made use of new galvanoplastic duplicating techniques; many of Ward's reductions and galvanoplastic and die-stamped relief panels survive.

His bronze statue of The Pilgrim, a 9 feet (2.7 m) tall stylized representation of one of the Pilgrims, British immigrants to the New World led by William Bradford who left from Plymouth, England, in the cargo ship Mayflower in September 1620, sits on Pilgrim Hill in Central Park in New York City. The statue faces westward on the crest of a little knoll at the top of the hill, on a rusticated Quincy granite pedestal that was created by architect Richard Morris Hunt, overlooking the East Drive at East 72nd Street. The statue was donated to New York City in 1885 by the New England Society of New York.

In 1902, with the collaboration of Paul Wayland Bartlett, he made the models for the marble pediment sculptures for the New York Stock Exchange. The pediment was carved by the Piccirilli Brothers.

Ward participated in numerous organizations and associations during his long career. He was a founder and president of the National Sculpture Society (1893–1905), president of the National Academy of Design (1874), and a member of the Fine Arts Federation, the Architectural League, the National Institute of Arts and Letters, the American Academy of Arts and Letters, The American Institute of Architects, the National Arts Club, and the Century Association. He sat on the Advisory Committee of Fine Arts of the City of New York at the World's Columbian Exposition of 1893 and on the Advisory Committee of Sculptors at the Louisiana Purchase Exposition in 1904. He was one of the original members of the Board of Trustees of The Metropolitan Museum of Art and served on its executive committee until 1901, as well as one of the first trustees in 1897 for the American Academy in Rome.

He died at his home in New York City in 1910. A copy of his Indian Hunter stands at his gravesite in Urbana, and his Urbana home is listed on the National Register of Historic Places. His sketchbooks are conserved at the Albany Institute of History & Art. His work was part of the sculpture event in the art competition at the 1928 Summer Olympics.

== Public sculpture ==
- 1866 Indian Hunter, in Central Park, Manhattan, New York City
- 1867 The Good Samaritan Ether Monument, Boston Public Garden, Boston, Massachusetts
- 1868 "Matthew Perry Monument", Touro Park, Newport, Rhode Island
- 1869 "Seventh Regiment Memorial", Central Park, New York City. The bronze of a standing Union soldier is set on a high granite pedestal along the West Carriage Drive at 69th Street. Actor and dramatist Steele MacKaye, who served in the 7th Regiment, was its model.
- 1871 Major General John F. Reynolds Statue, Gettysburg National Military Park, Gettysburg, Pennsylvania
- 1872 William Shakespeare, Central Park, New York City
- 1873 Israel Putnam, Bushnell Park, Hartford, Connecticut
- 1878 George Washington, Bartlet Mall, Newburyport, Massachusetts
- 1878 William Gilmore Simms, White Point Garden, Charleston, South Carolina
- 1879 Major General George Henry Thomas, Thomas Circle, Washington, D.C.
- 1881 "Victory" (statue), Yorktown Victory Monument, Yorktown, Virginia
- 1881 General Daniel Morgan Monument, Spartanburg, South Carolina
- 1882 George Washington, Federal Hall National Memorial, New York City
- 1883 Lafayette, University of Vermont, Burlington, Vermont
- 1884 The Pilgrim, Pilgrim Hill, Central Park, New York City
- 1887 James A. Garfield Monument, Capitol Hill, Washington, D.C.
- 1888 Lincoln Goodale Monument, Goodale Park, Columbus, Ohio
- 1891 Henry Ward Beecher Monument, Cadman Plaza, Brooklyn, New York
- 1893 Governor Horace Fairbanks, St. Johnsbury Athenaeum, St. Johnsbury, Vermont
- 1898 Equestrian statue of General Winfield S. Hancock, Smith Memorial Arch, Philadelphia, Pennsylvania
- 1903 Integrity Protecting the Works of Man, pediment of the New York Stock Exchange Building, Manhattan, New York City
- 1905 Abraham Coles (bust), Washington Park, Newark, New Jersey
- 1910 Financier August Belmont, Newport, Rhode Island
- 1916 General Phillip H. Sheridan Statue, East Capitol Park, Albany, New York (installed posthumously)

== Gallery ==
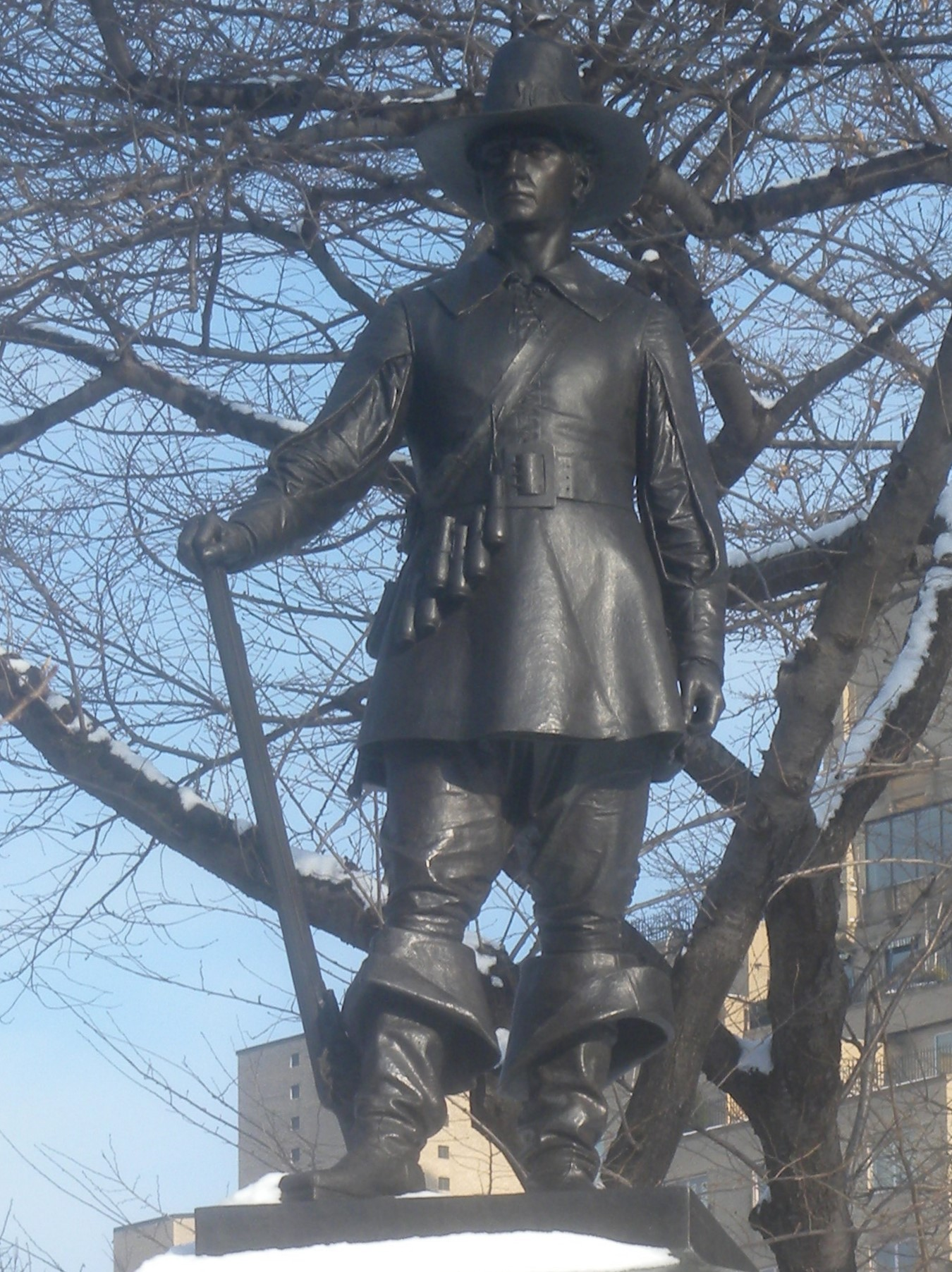
The Pilgrim, 1884, Central Park, New York City

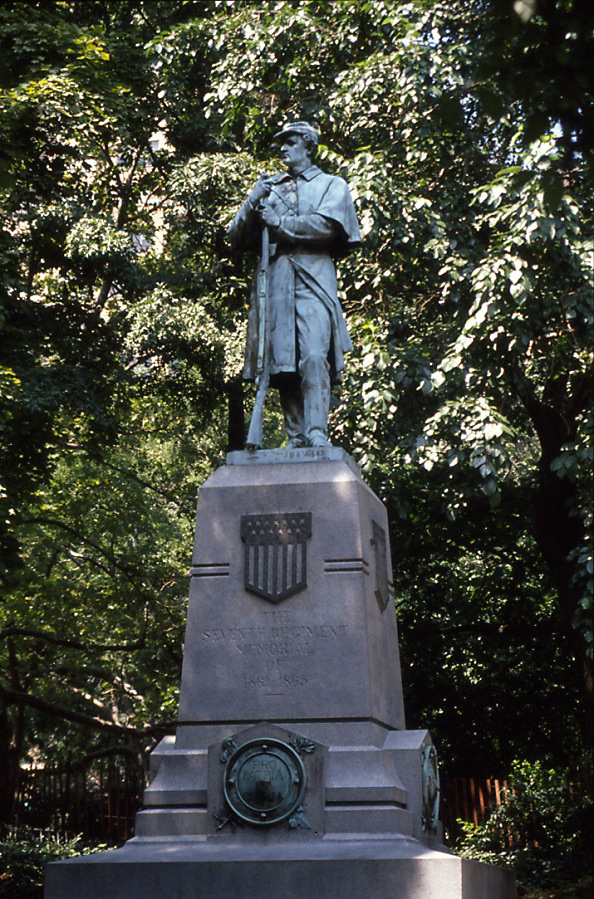
7th Regiment Monument, Central Park, New York City

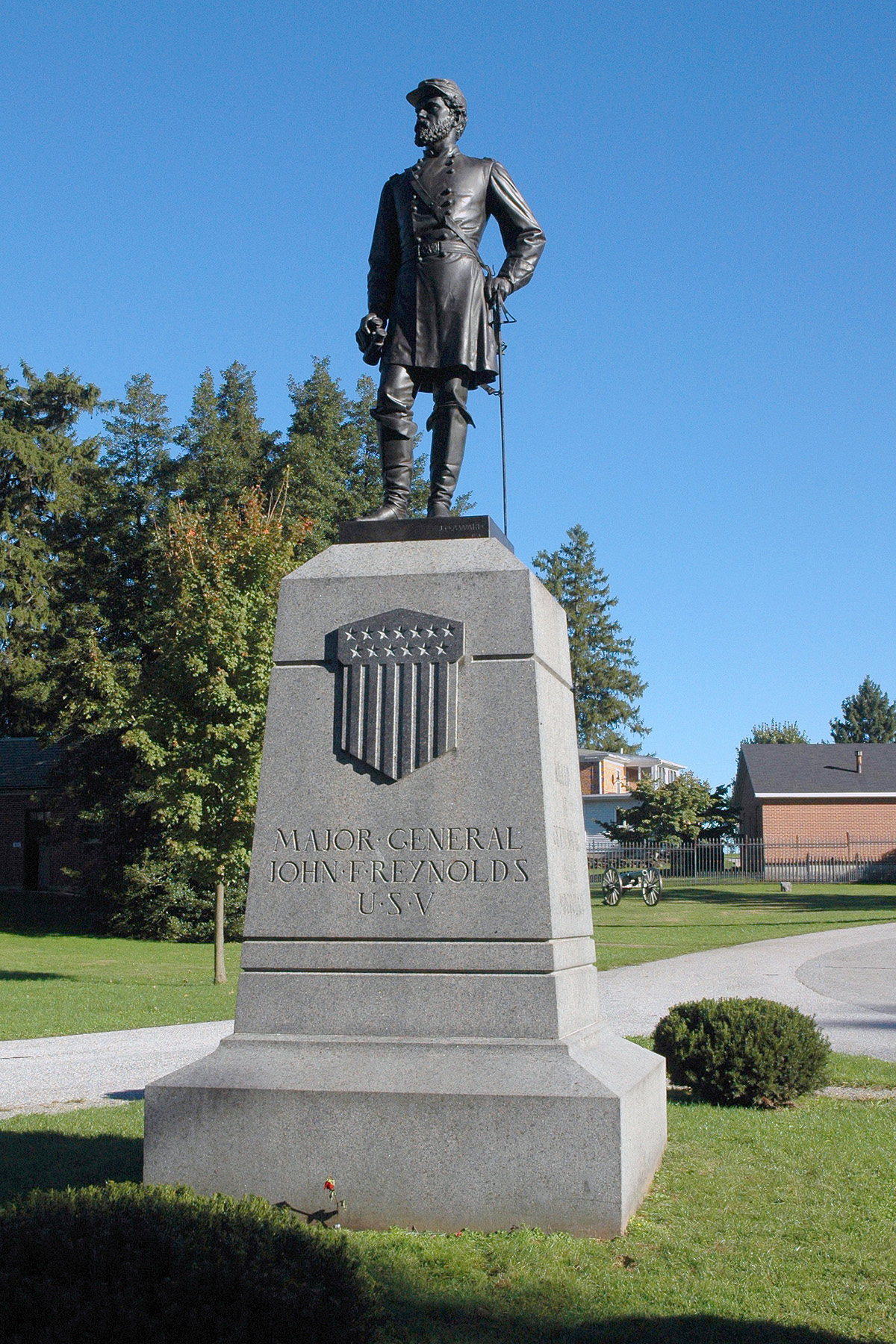
Major General John F. Reynolds Statue, Gettysburg National Military Park

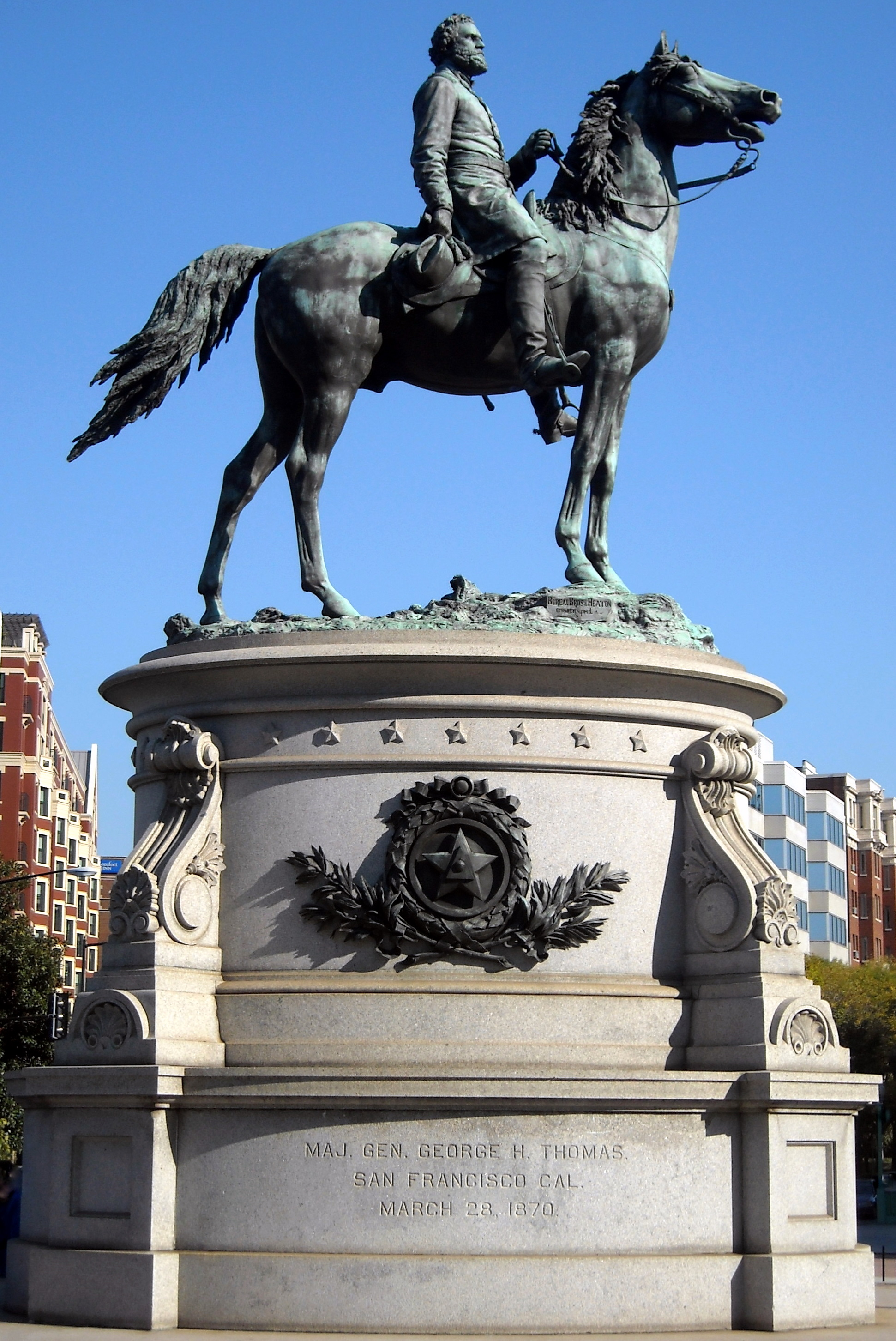
Major General George Henry Thomas, Thomas Circle, Washington, D.C.

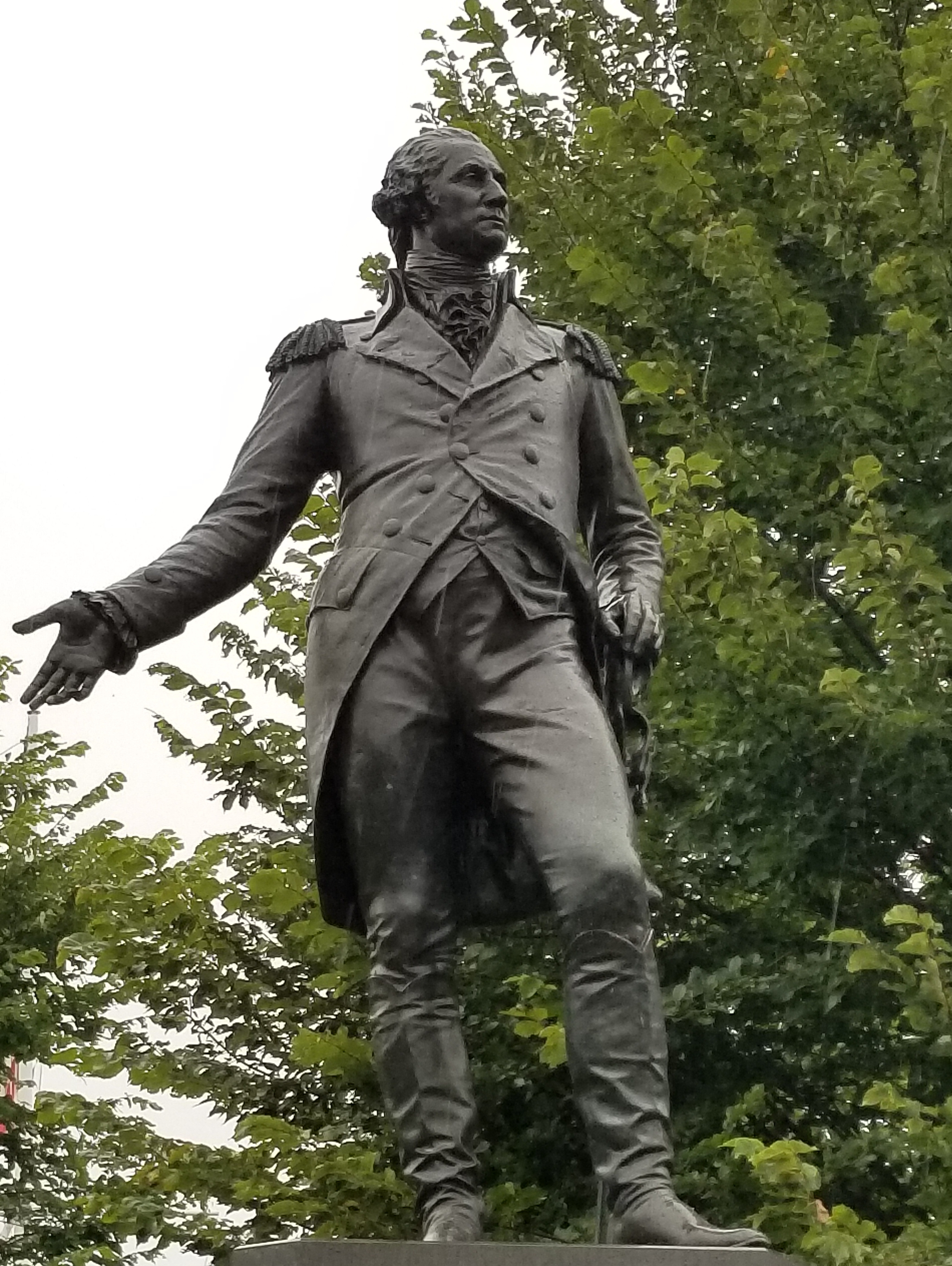
George Washington, Newburyport, Massachusetts

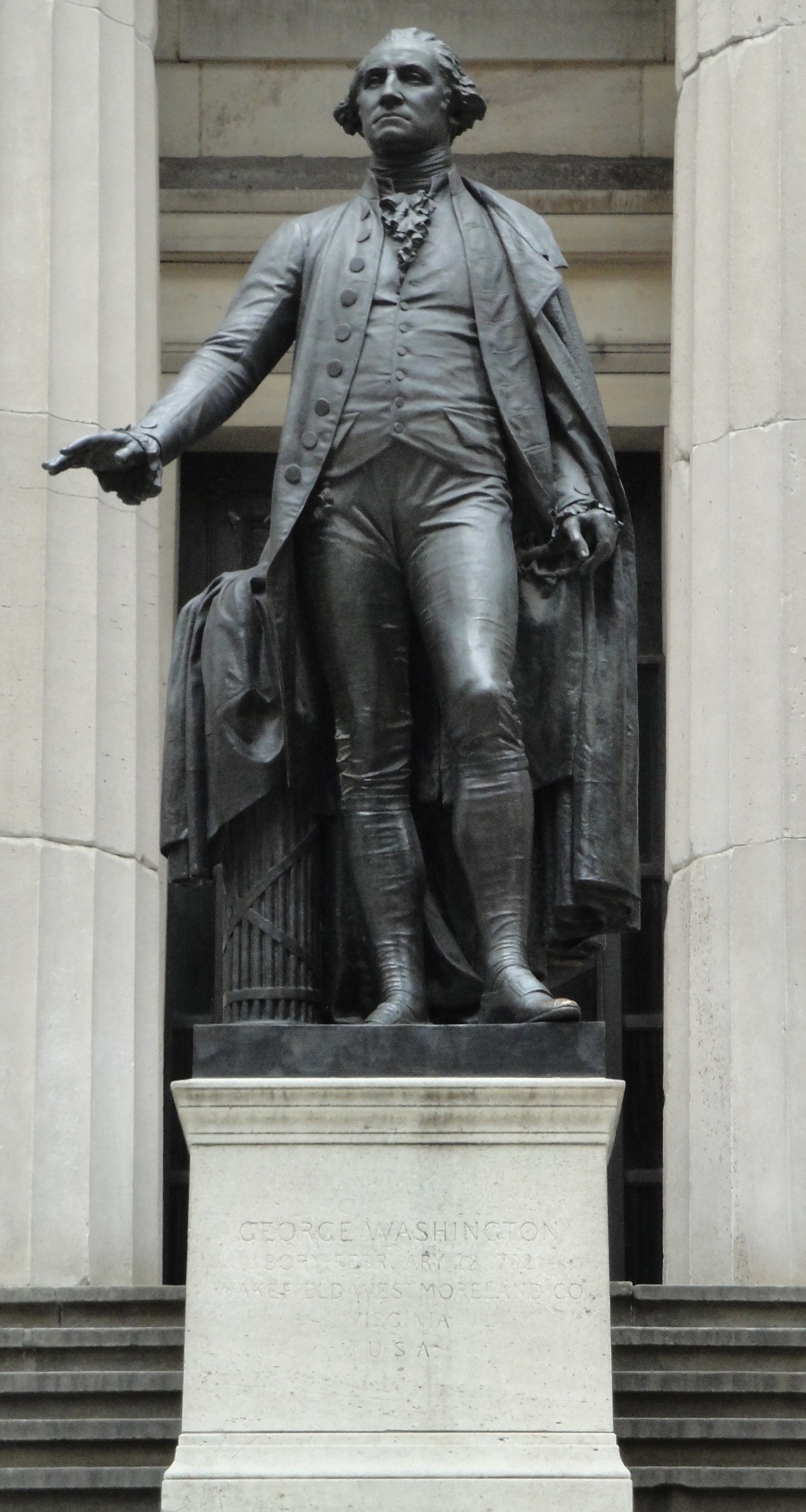
George Washington, Federal Hall National Memorial, New York City

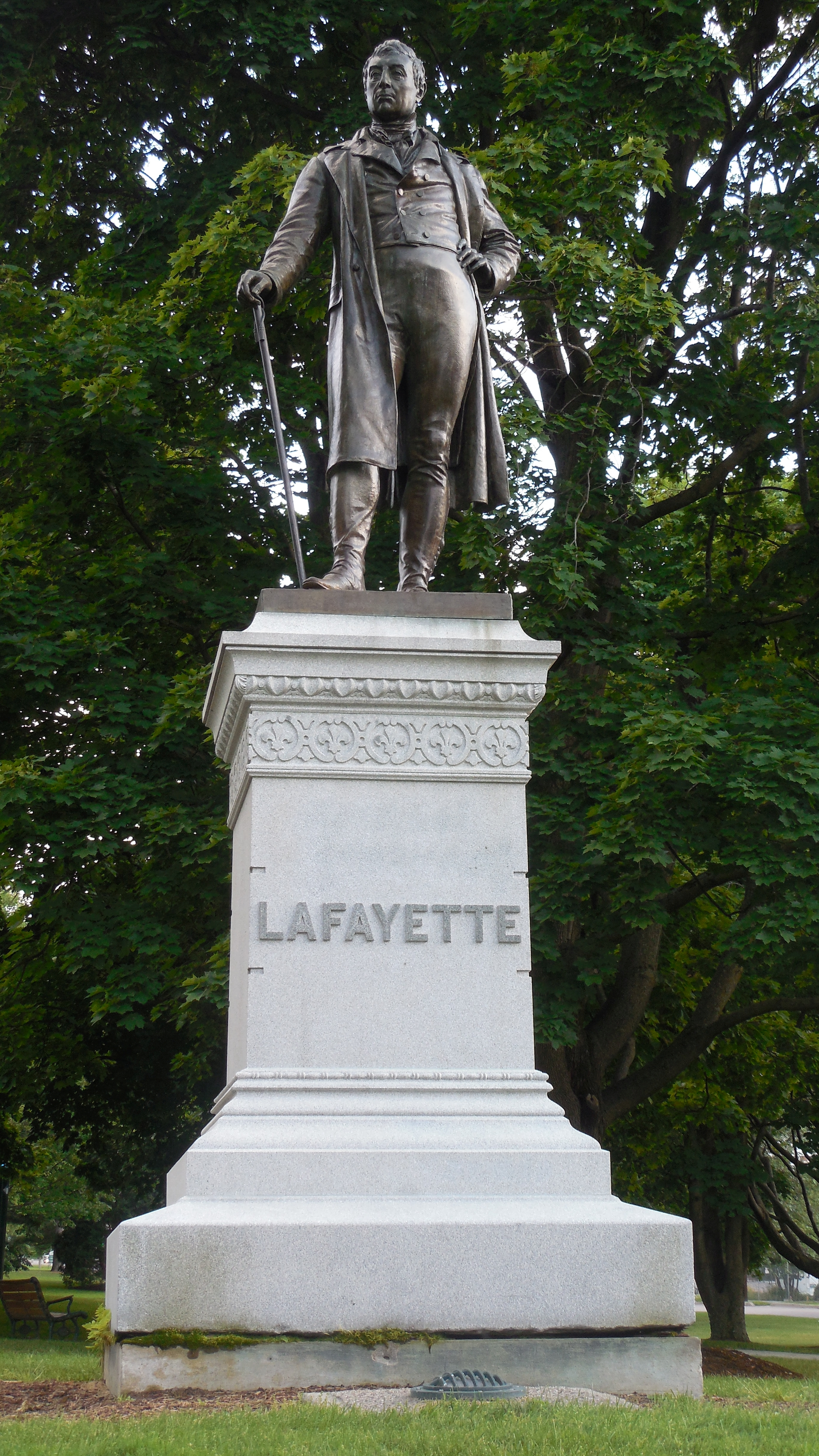
Statue of Marquis de Lafayette, University of Vermont Green, Burlington, Vermont

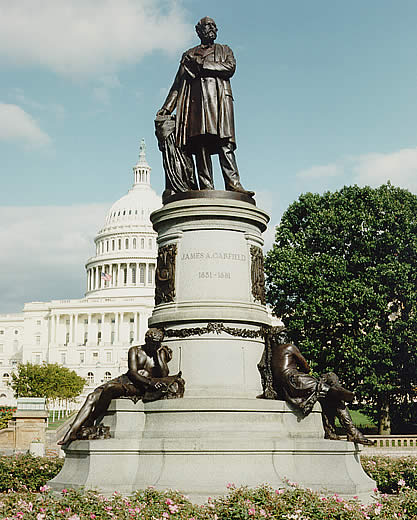
James A. Garfield Monument, United States Capitol grounds, Washington, D.C.

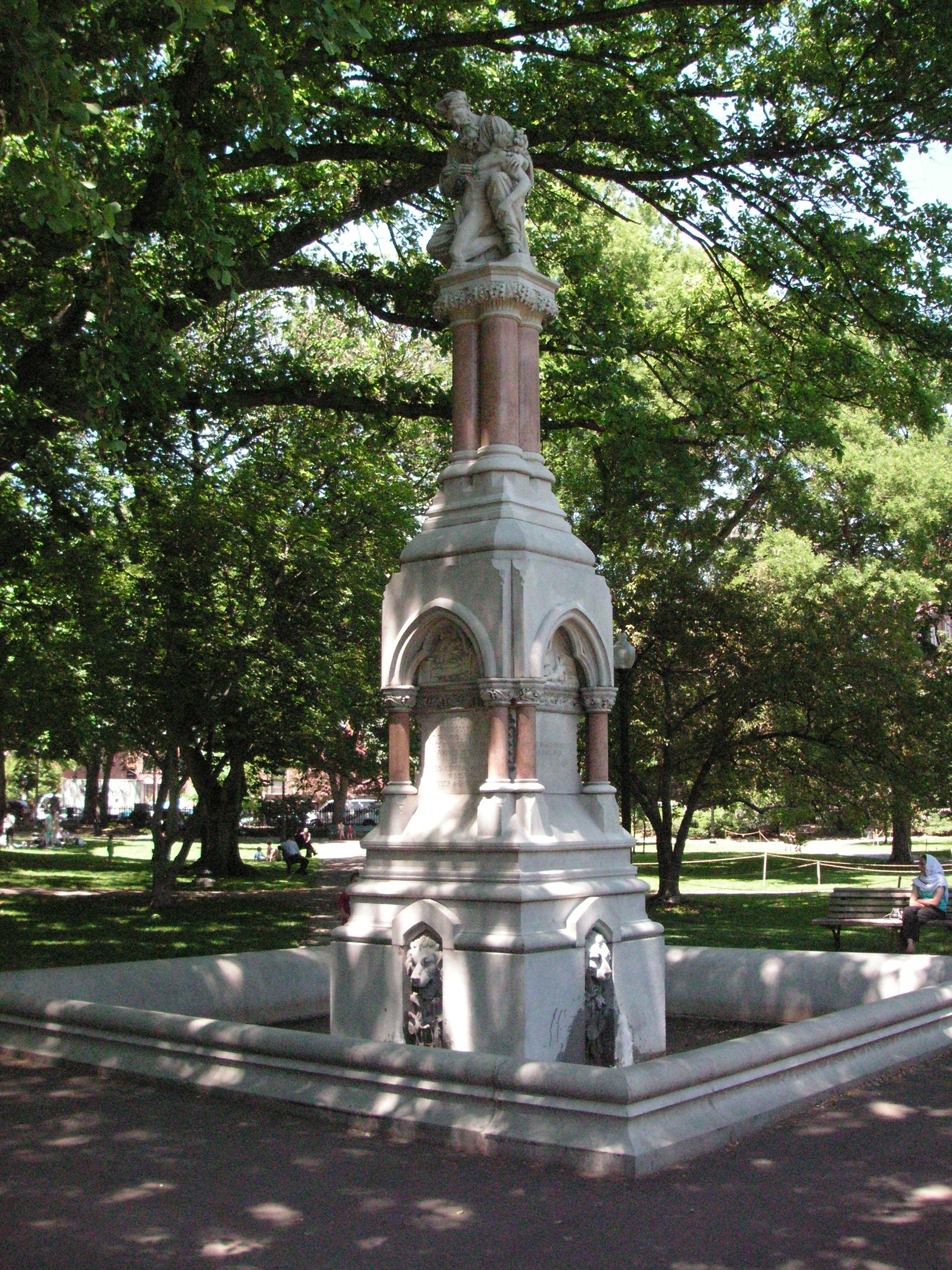
Ether Monument, Boston Public Garden

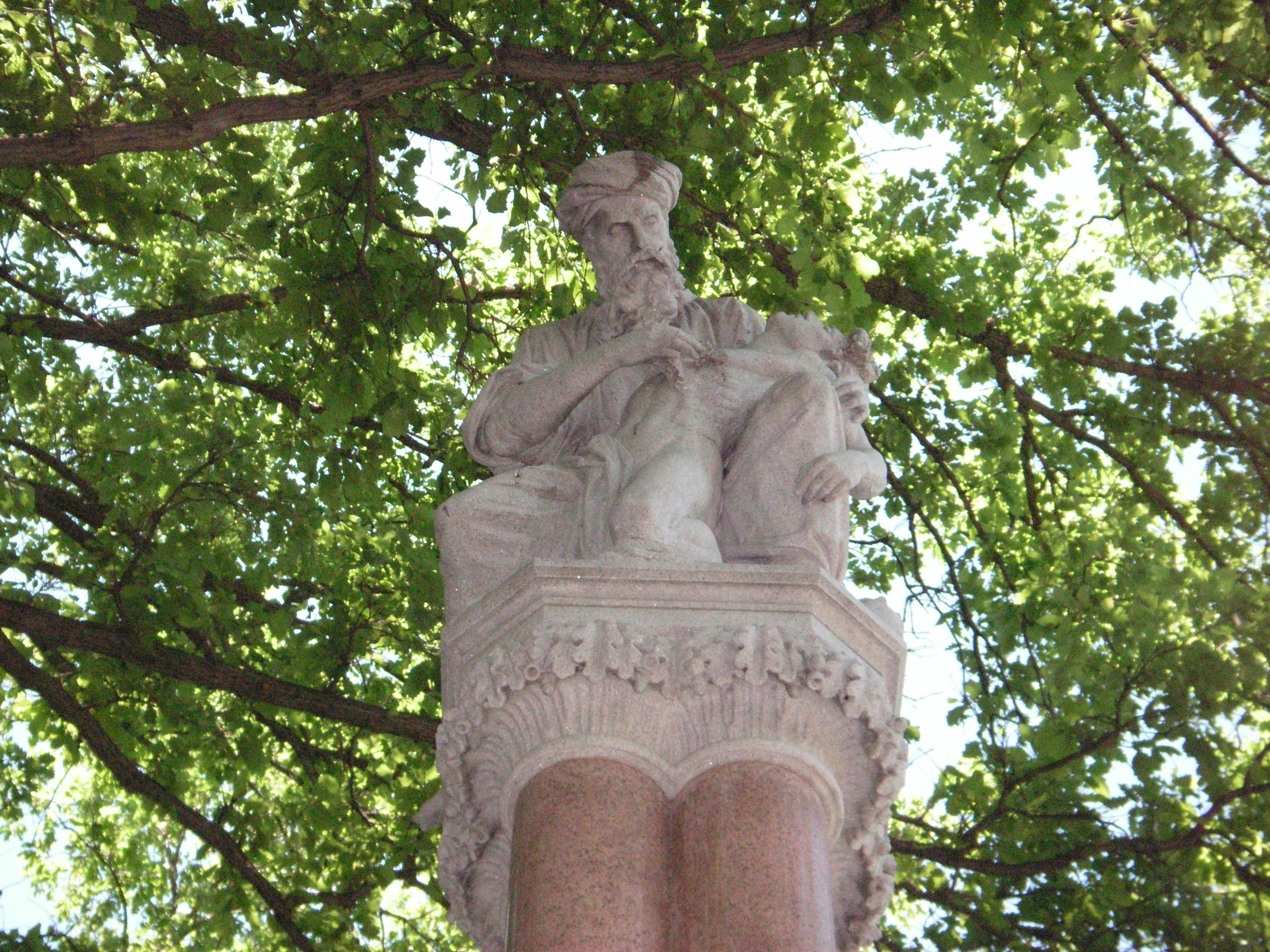
Ether Monument, Boston Public Garden

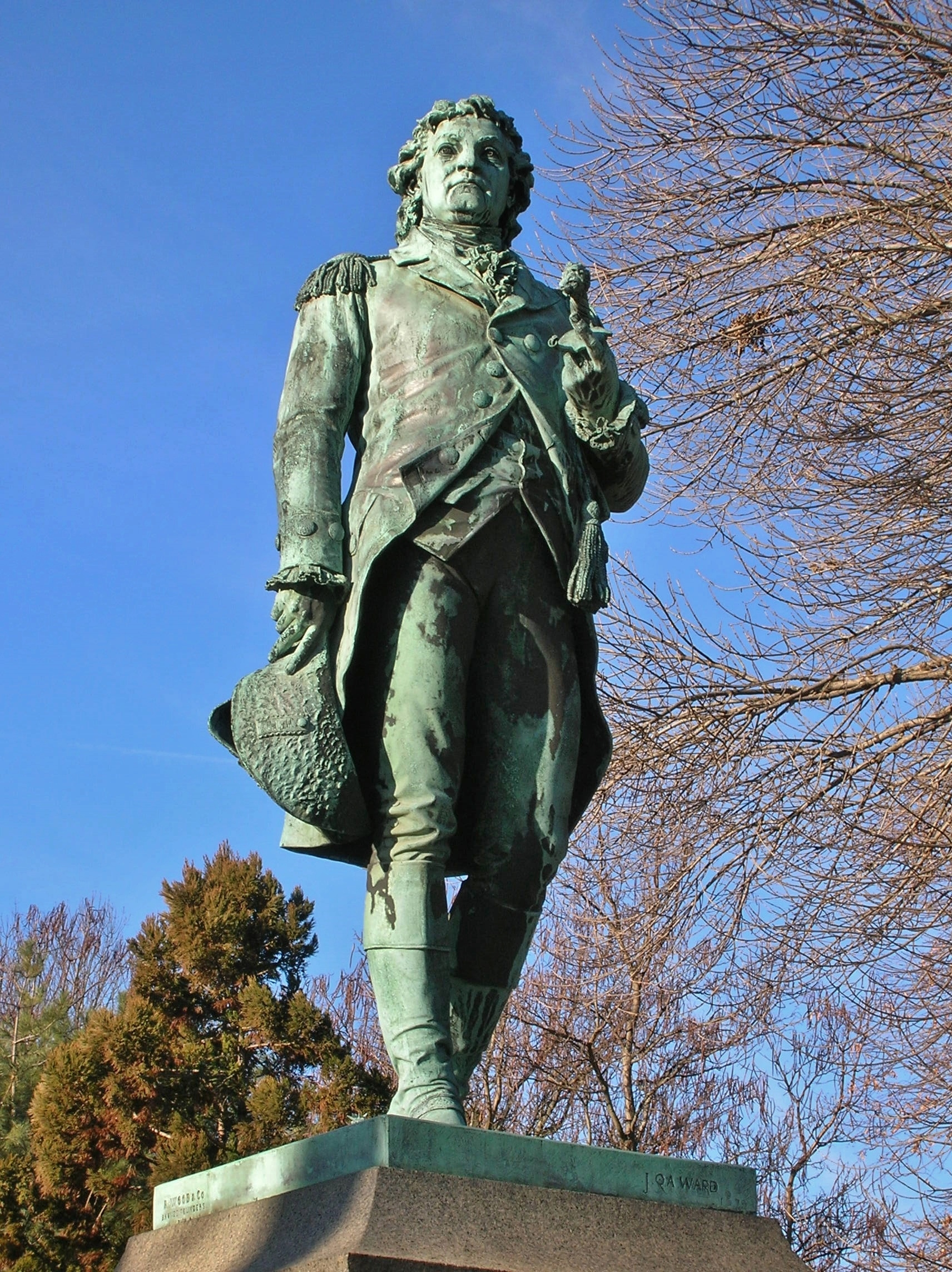
Israel Putnam Statue, Bushnell Park, Hartford

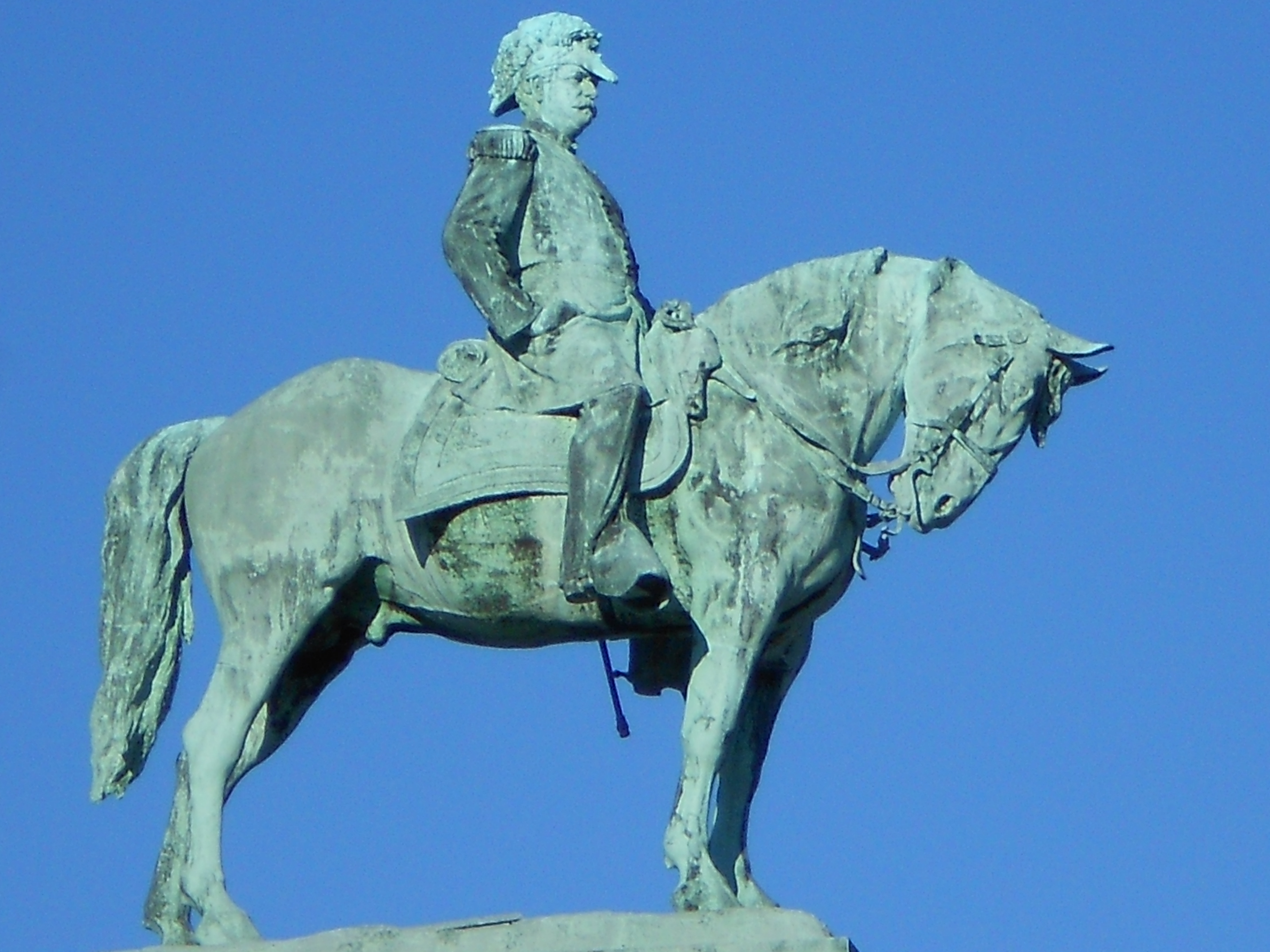
Smith Memorial Arch, Philadelphia

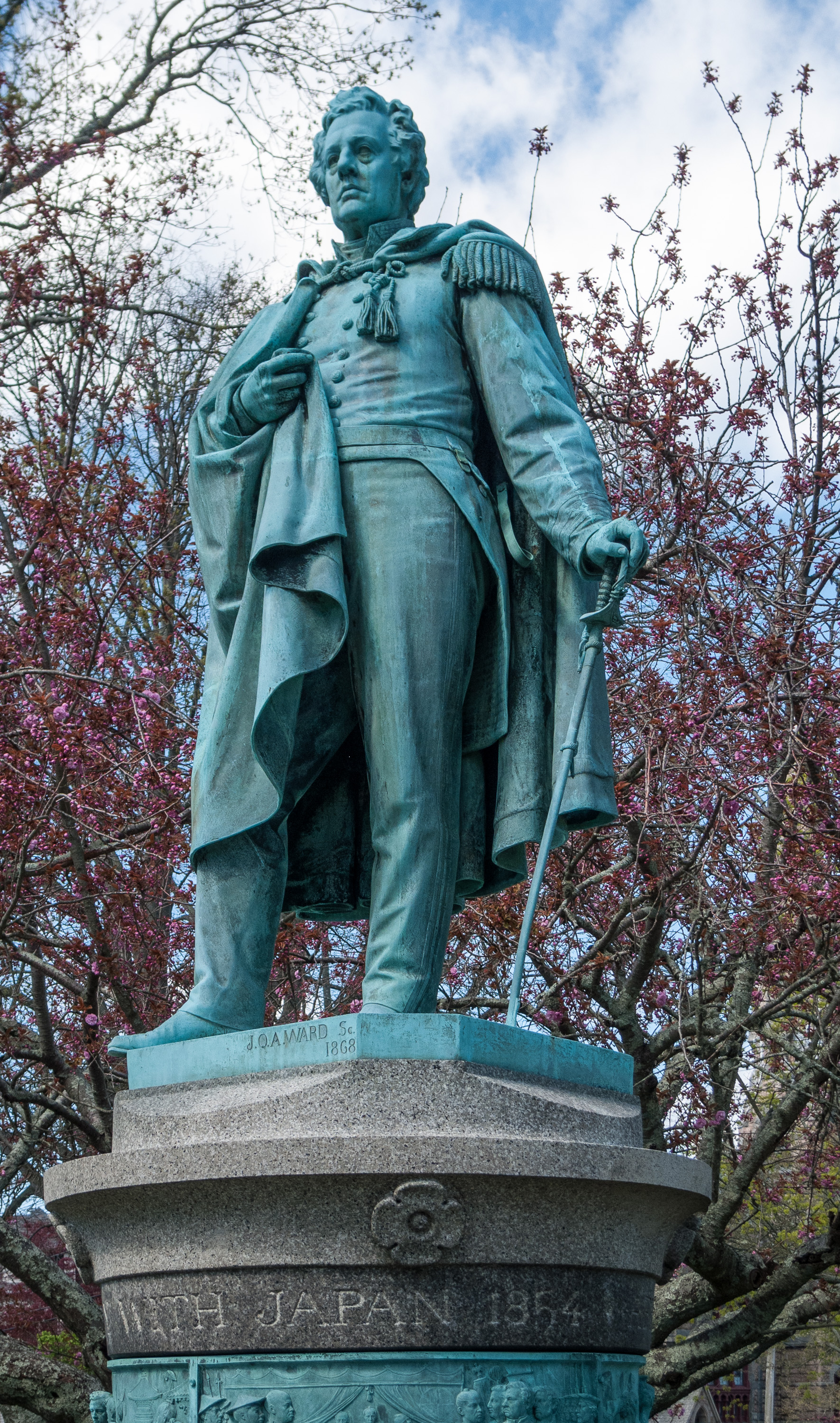
Matthew Perry statue, Touro Park, Newport, Rhode Island

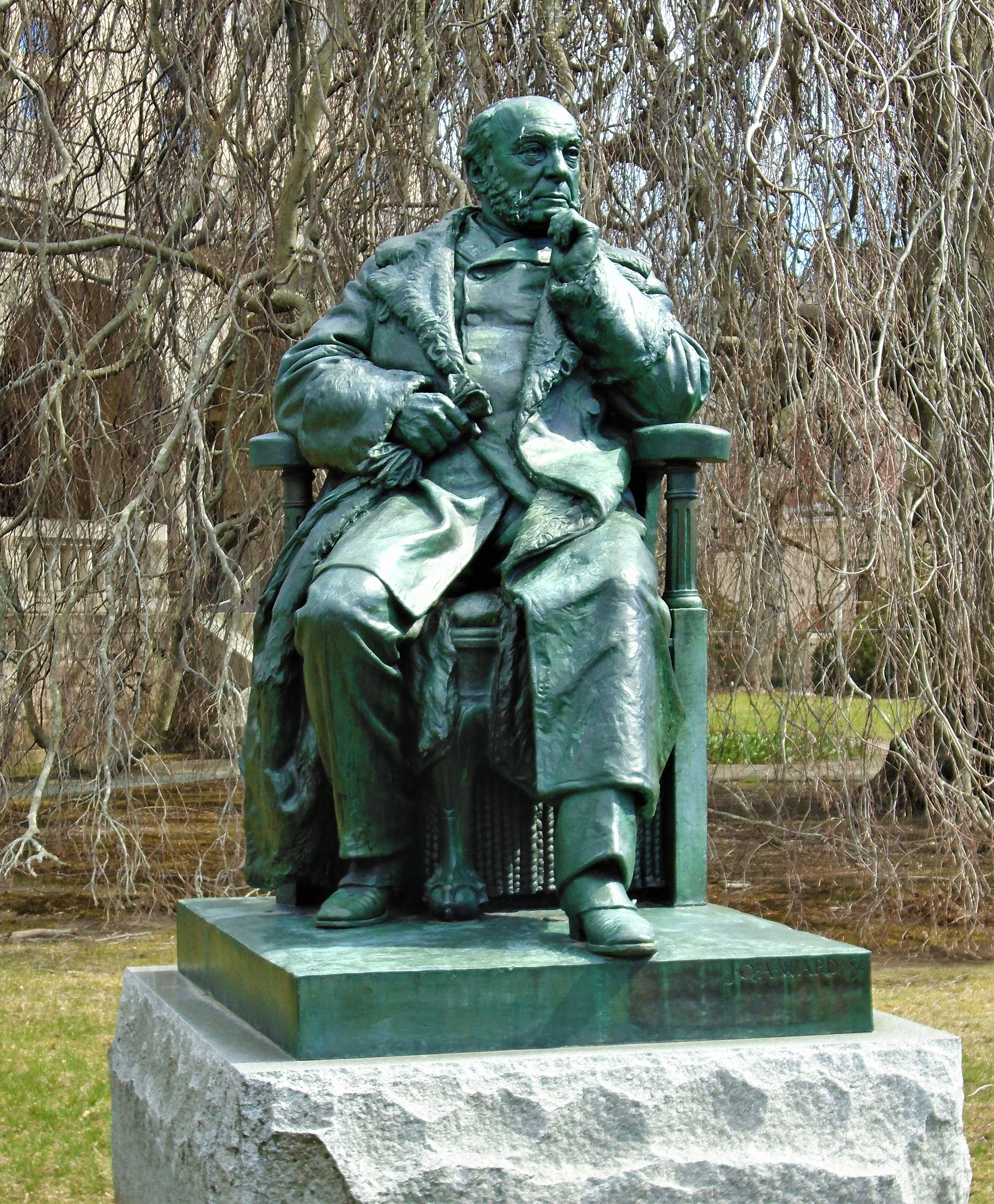
August Belmont statue, Newport, Rhode Island
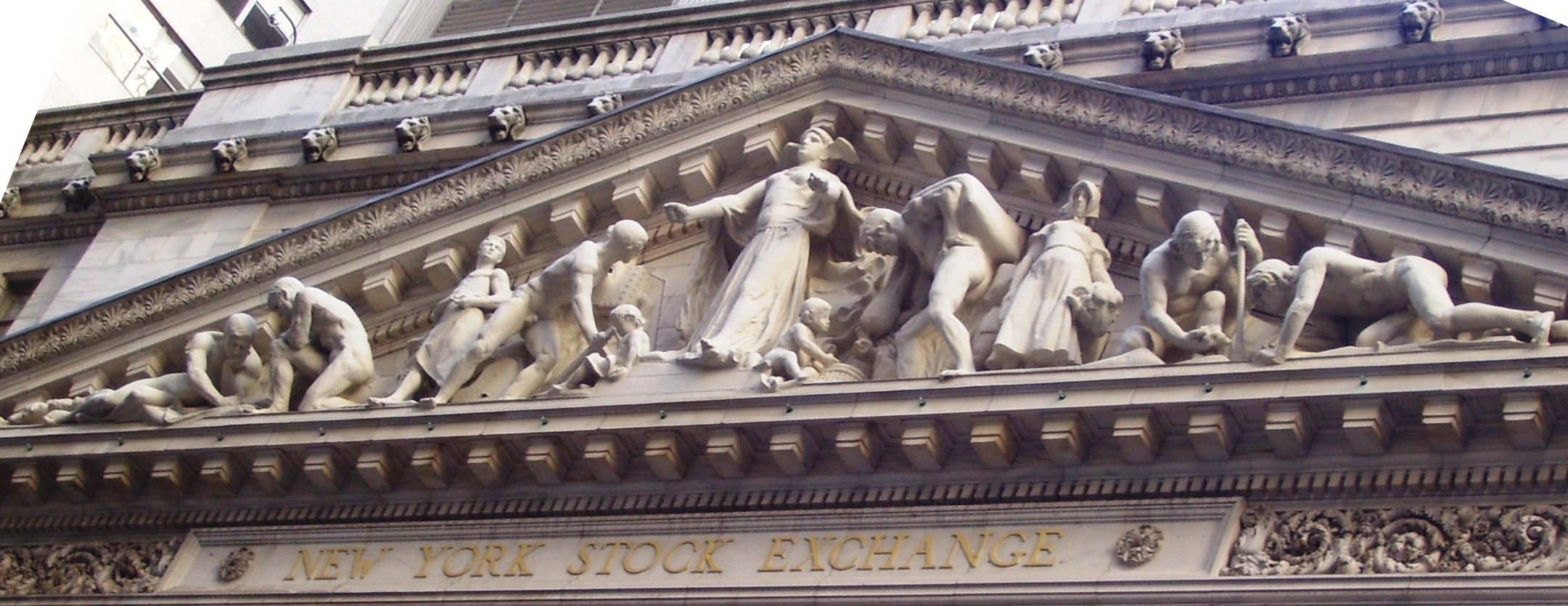
Integrity Protecting the Works of Man on the pediment of the New York Stock Exchange Building, Integrity, in the center, wears the winged cap of Mercury, the god of commerce. The figures on her left represent mining and agriculture, and on her right, industry. The original pediment, carved from Georgia marble, weighed 90 tons, but time and pollution wore away at it, and in 1936 it was replaced by a copper and lead replica which weighs 10 tons.
