= New England Society =

American lineage association formed in 1805

New England Society in the City of New York
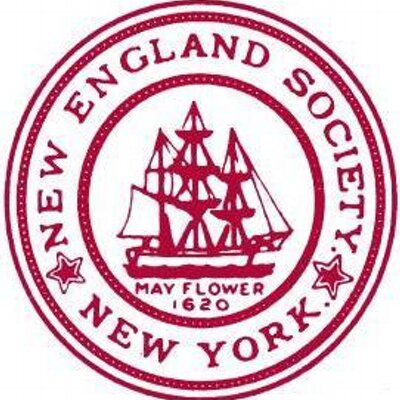
- Emblem of the New England Society
- Formation: 1805; 221 years ago
- Type: Lineage organization
- Headquarters: 150 East 55th Street
- Website: nesnyc.org

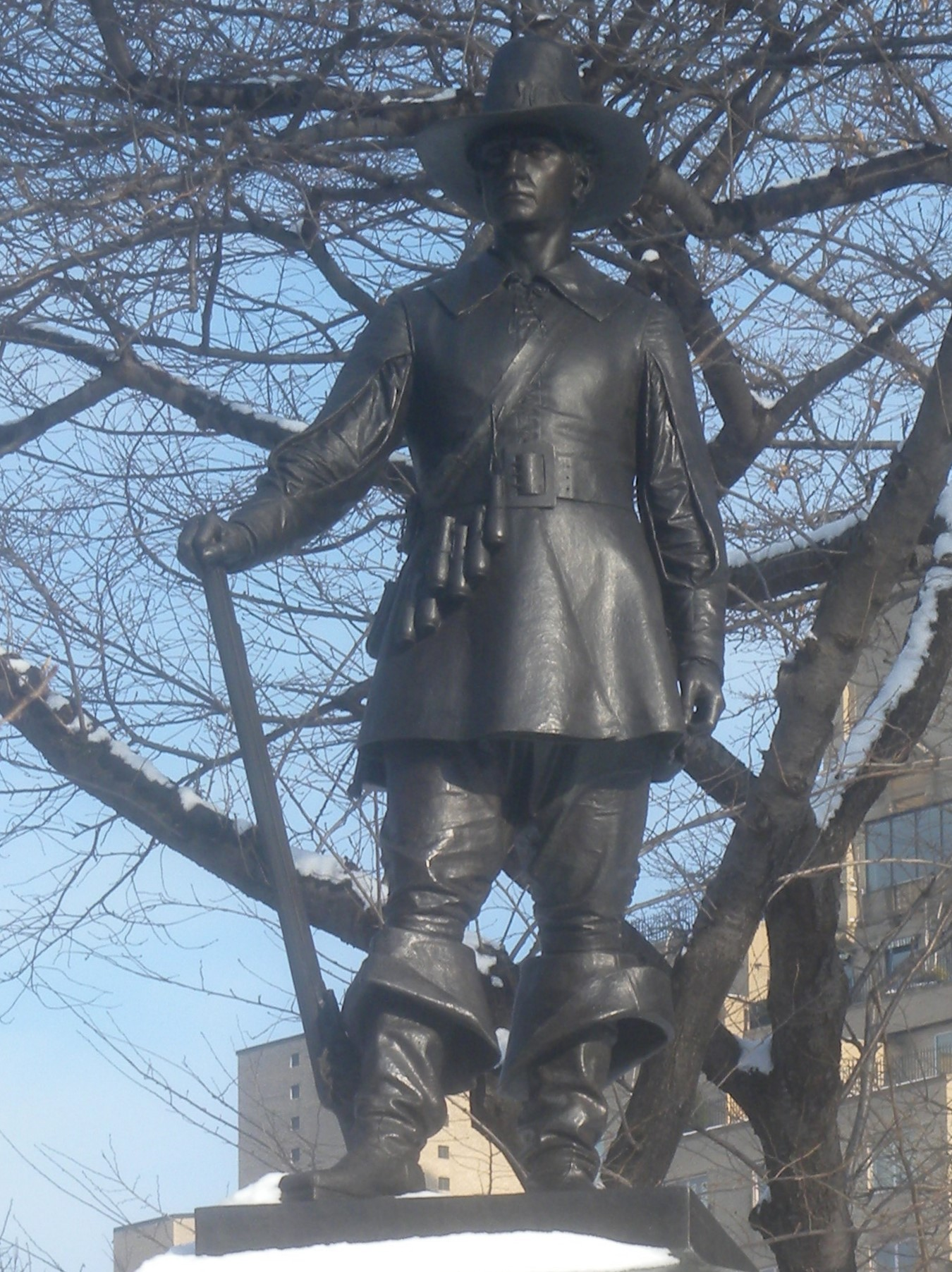
The Pilgrim, Central Park

The New England Society in the City of New York (NES) is one of several lineage organizations in the United States and one of the oldest charitable societies in the country. It was founded in 1805 to promote “friendship, charity and mutual assistance” among and on behalf of New Englanders living in New York.

== History ==
The founding NES meeting was held on May 6, 1805, at the State Street home of merchant, statesman, and first NES president James Watson. Watson’s Federal townhouse still stands and is on the National Register of Historic Places. It was also the residence of Elizabeth Ann Seton, the first American Catholic saint. As of 2012, the home was occupied by the rectory of the Our Lady of the Holy Rosary Church and is part of the Seton Shrine.

The first annual dinner was held on December 21, 1805, at the City Hotel on Broadway with 154 members in attendance. Every year since 1805, the Society has hosted speakers at various venues, including Delmonico's Restaurant, the Waldorf-Astoria Hotel, and Sherry’s in New York City. Speakers at these dinners included Commander Stephen Decatur, War of 1812 hero; statesman Daniel Webster; U.S. President Ulysses S. Grant, J. Pierpont Morgan, who also served as the 26th NES president; Theodore Roosevelt; Ralph Waldo Emerson; Mark Twain (Samuel Clemens); and Woodrow Wilson.

In 1885, the New England Society of New York donated the statue The Pilgrim to New York City. The bronze statue, by sculptor John Quincy Adams Ward, is a 9 feet (2.7 m) tall stylized representation of one of the Pilgrims, British immigrants to the New World led by William Bradford who left from Plymouth, England, in the cargo ship Mayflower in September 1620. The statue faces westward on the crest of a little knoll at the top of Pilgrim Hill in Central Park in New York City, on a rusticated Quincy granite pedestal that was created by architect Richard Morris Hunt, overlooking the East Drive at East 72nd Street.

== Education ==
In 1953, NES launched the NES Scholarship Program to provide access to higher education to deserving young scholars. NES provides funding for New York City students attending colleges and universities in New England.

== Membership ==
The Society maintains its headquarters in midtown Manhattan. Full membership requires evidence of New England ancestry, education, or residence; associate membership is available to those who share an affinity for New England and the mission of NES.

== Notable members ==
- Chester A. Arthur
- William T. Blodgett
- William Cullen Bryant
- Grover Cleveland
- Calvin Coolidge
- Horace Greeley
- Rush Christopher Hawkins
- Morris K. Jessup
- John F. Kennedy
- Seth Low
- Nathaniel Frary Miller
- J.P. Morgan
- Levi P. Morton
- Charles Pratt
- John D. Rockefeller
- Theodore Roosevelt
- Elihu Root
- Elliott Fitch Shepard
- Charles Tiffany
- John Trumbull

== See also ==
- New England Soldiers' Relief Association
