= Indian Hunter (Ward) =

Sculpture by John Quincy Adams Ward in Central Park, New York City, U.S.

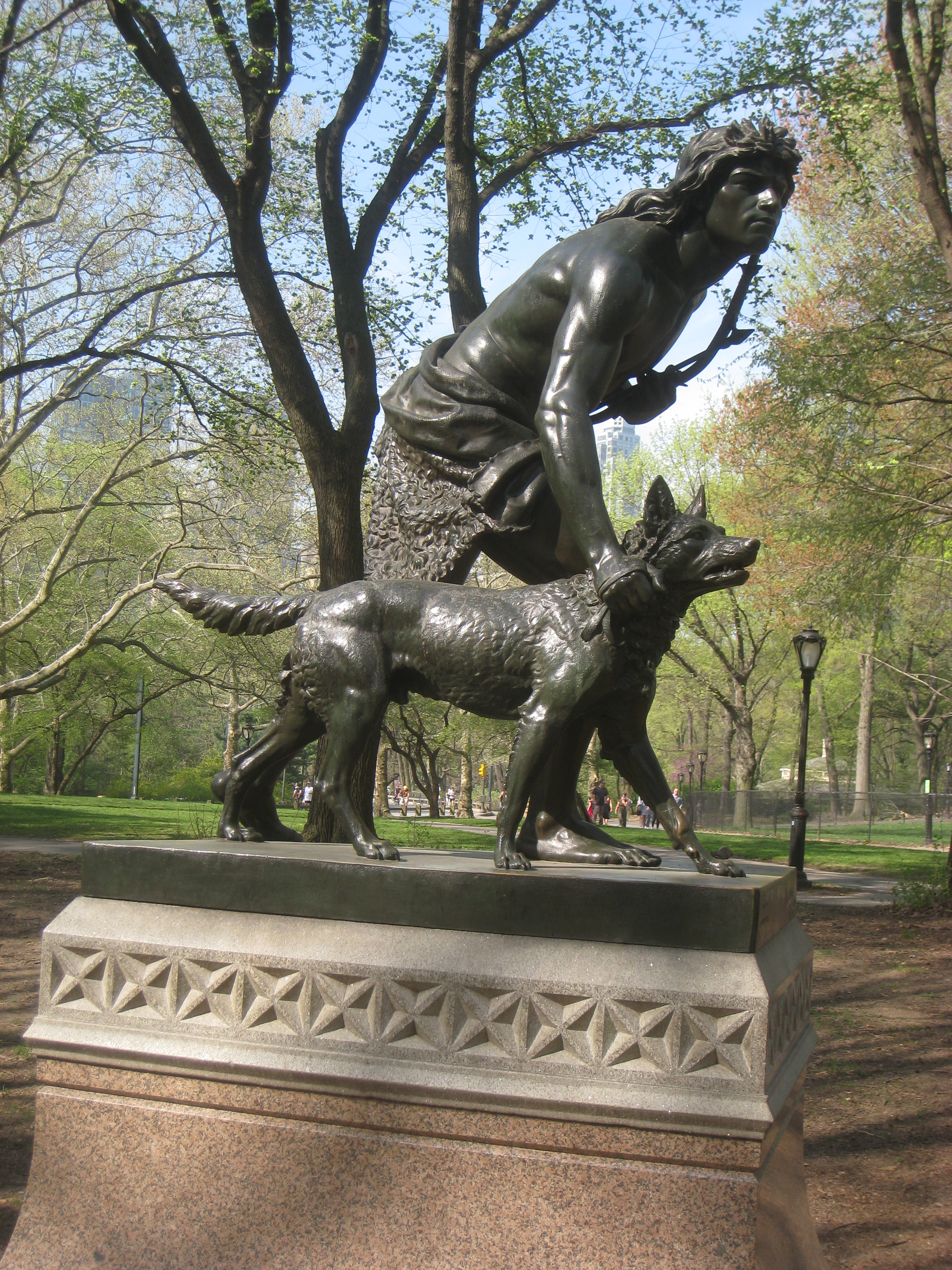
- The sculpture in 2010
- Artist: John Quincy Adams Ward
- Year: 1866
- Type: Sculpture
- Medium: Bronze
- Location: New York City, New York, United States; 40°46′14″N 73°58′23″W

Indian Hunter is an outdoor bronze sculpture by John Quincy Adams Ward, located at Central Park in Manhattan, New York.

It was cast in bronze in 1866 at the L.A. Amouroux, NY at a cost of $10,000. It was displayed at the Paris Exposition in 1867 and was later presented to the city of New York, where it was unveiled on February 4, 1869. The statue was the first sculpture by an American artist at Central Park, which at the time was only 11 years old.

== Physical description ==
The plinth is polished Rockport granite, and the statue, which depicts a larger than life size hunter and dog, is made of bronze. The dimensions of the monument atop the plinth is 10 ft (3m) wide, 5 ft (1.5m) deep, and 6'3" (1.9m) tall.
