= Statue of George Washington (Newburyport, Massachusetts) =

1878 statue by John Quincy Adams Ward in Newburyport, Massachusetts

George Washington
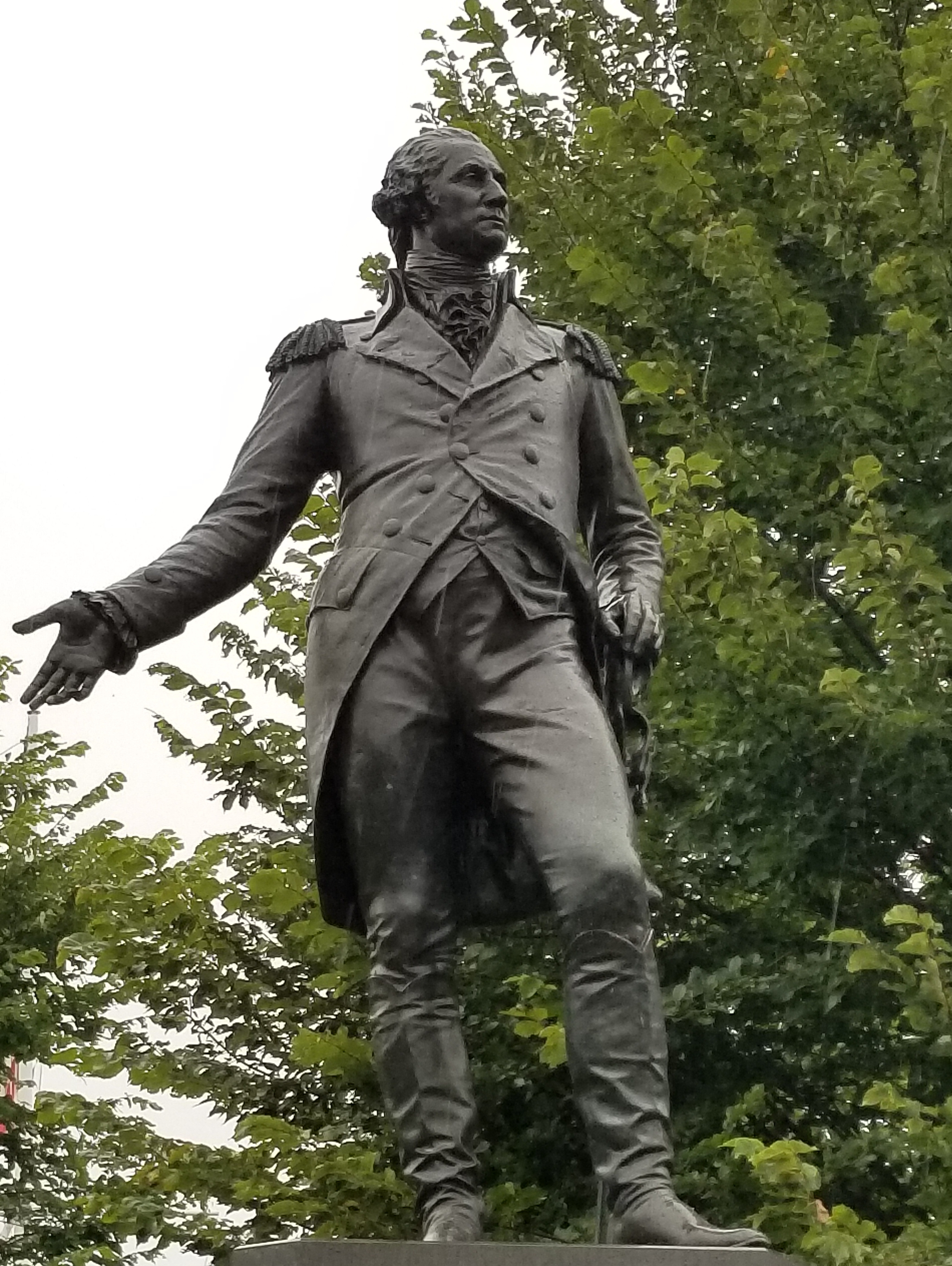
- George Washington by John Quincy Adams Ward
- Artist: John Quincy Adams Ward
- Year: 1878, dedicated February 22, 1879
- Medium: Bronze
- Subject: George Washington
- Dimensions: 2.4 m (8 ft)
- Location: Newburyport, Massachusetts, United States; 42°48′27.2″N 70°52′21.6″W

George Washington is a larger than life-sife, outdoor, 1878 bronze statue by the American sculptor John Quincy Adams Ward and located in Newburyport, Massachusetts. It depicts General George Washington addressing the Continental Army as commander-in-chief. The statue was dedicated on his birthday, February 22, in 1879.

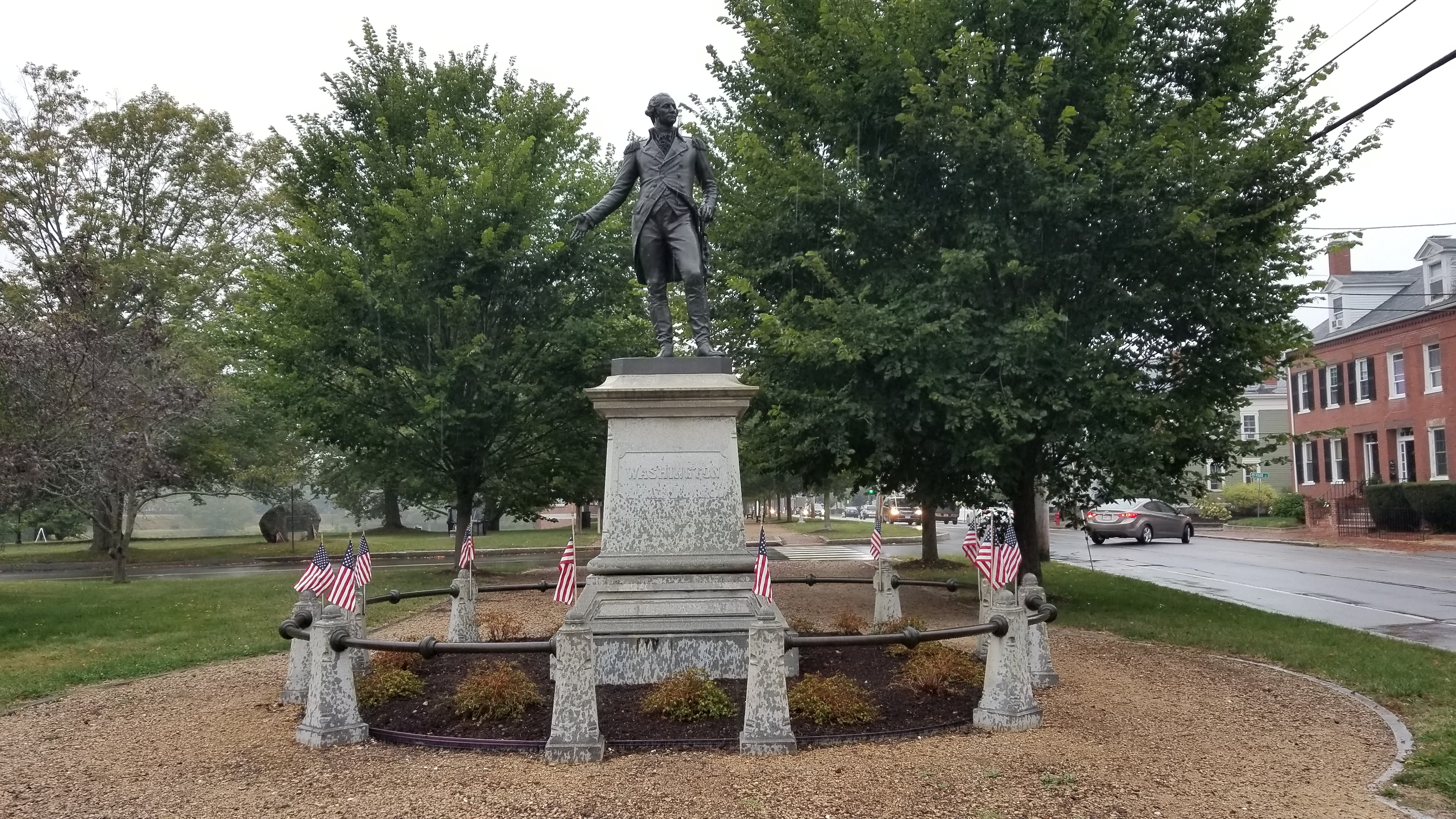
Area view of the statue

== See also ==
- 1878 in art
- List of memorials to George Washington
- List of statues of George Washington

== Bibliography ==
- Sharp, Lewis I. (1985). John Quincy Adams Ward – Dean of American Sculpture: with a catalogue raisonné. University of Delaware Press. ISBN 978-0874132533. OCLC 10849454.
