= Henry Ward Beecher Monument =

Sculpture by John Quincy Adams Ward in Brooklyn, New York, U.S.

Coordinates: 40°41′41.5″N 73°59′24.4″W

Statue of Henry Ward Beecher
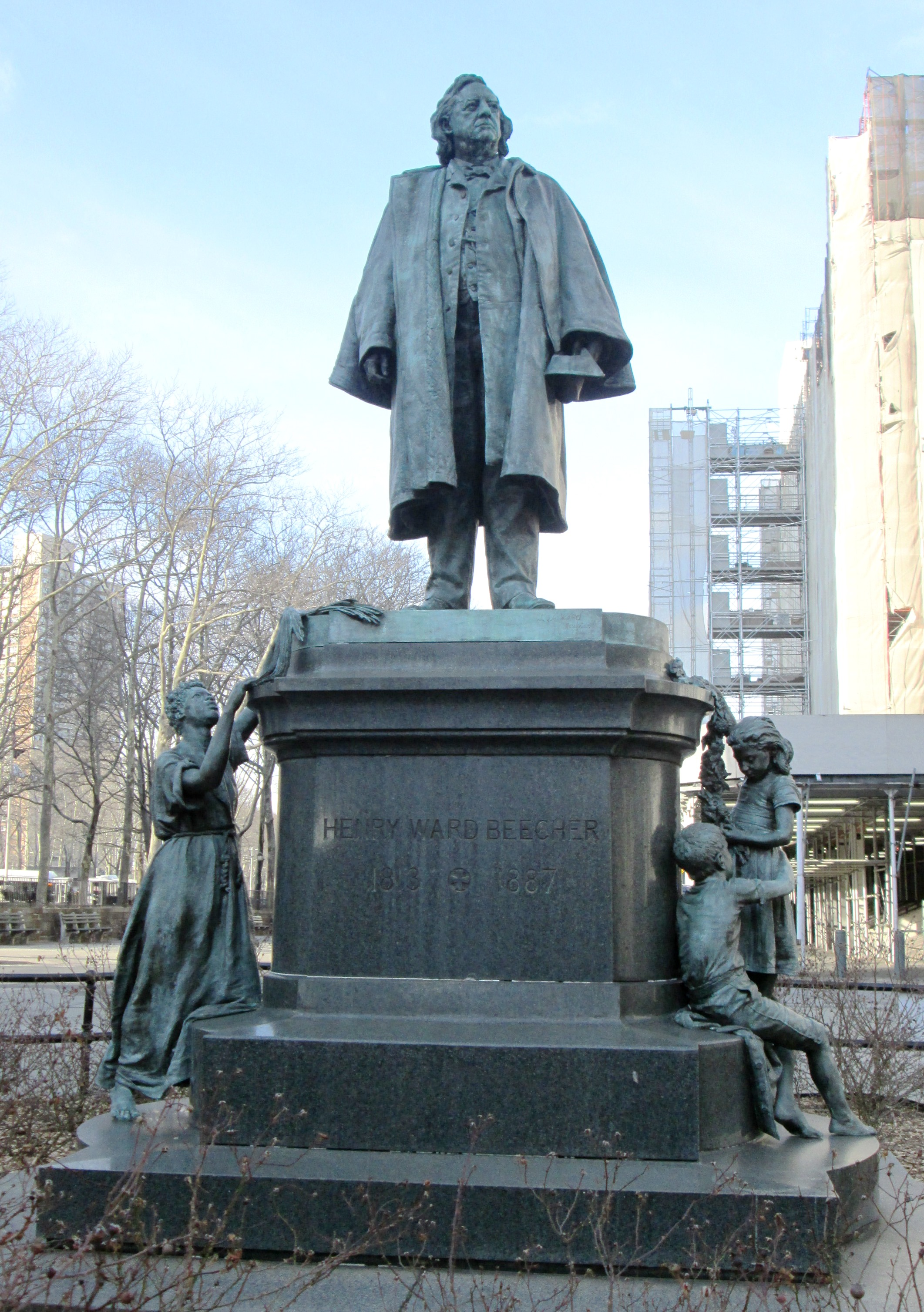
- Year: 1890
- Medium: Bronze; granite
- Subject: Henry Ward Beecher
- Location: New York City, New York, U.S.

The Henry Ward Beecher Monument, a statue of Henry Ward Beecher created by the sculptor John Quincy Adams Ward, was unveiled on June 24, 1891, in Borough Hall Park, Brooklyn and was later relocated to Cadman Plaza, Brooklyn in 1959.

== Background ==
Henry Ward Beecher was a 19th-century liberal theologian, preacher, and orator. After making a death mask of Beecher, Ward was contracted to execute the Beecher monument on April 6, 1888, for by the Beecher Statue Fund to "design, model, execute and complete in fine bronze a statue...eight feet in height." To create the monument, Ward worked from the death mask in addition to photographs.

The figures of the children below the base of the monument symbolize the role Beecher played in the abolitionist movement and his devotion to children. According to the Metropolitan Museum of Art catalog by Lewis I. Sharp, the statue was widely acclaimed as one of the finest public monuments in the country. There was criticism from Beecher's family and friends regarding the accuracy of the subject's likeness.

== Description ==
The monument features a bronze figural group by John Quincy Adams Ward and Barre granite base designed by architect Richard Morris Hunt. The statues depict Beecher, in subordinate positions are a Black female figure, to the left of the base, and, rightward, two Caucasian children (a boy and girl). The monument was cast on May 10, 1890, and dedicated on June 24, 1891. It was conserved via the Adopt-a-Monument Program in 1987.

== See also ==
- 1890 in art
