= Elizabeth Augusta Russell =

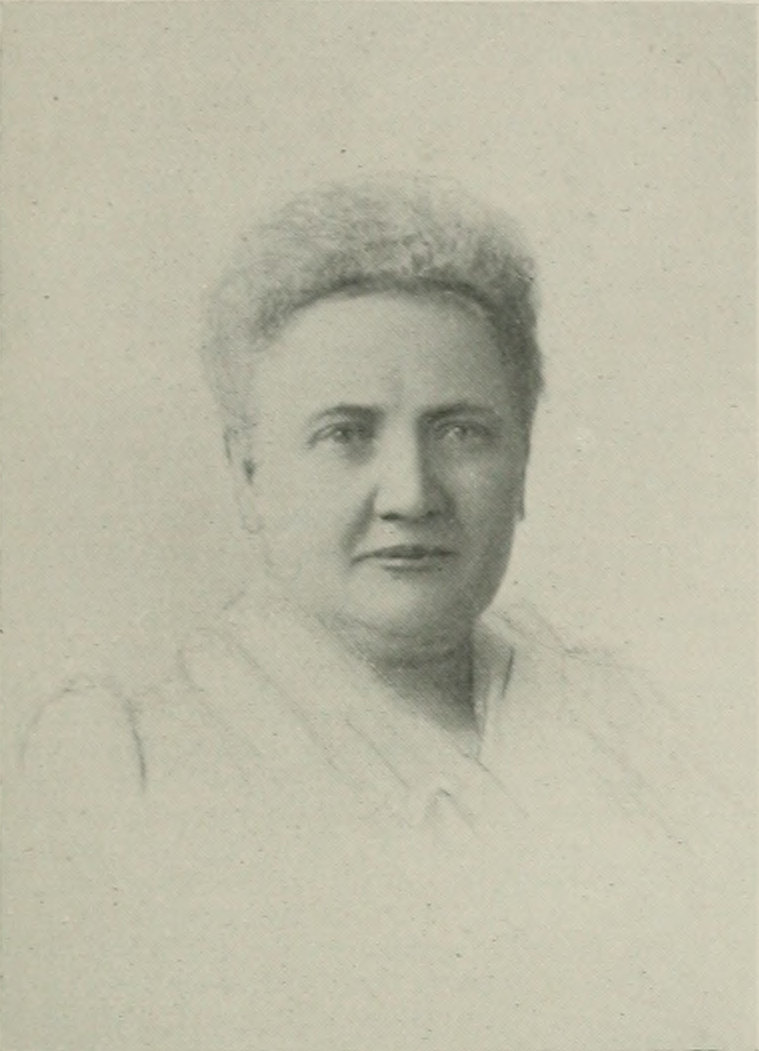
- Portrait photo from A Woman of the Century
- Born: Elizabeth Augusta Sawtell; October 3, 1832; Mason, New Hampshire, U.S.
- Died: January 7, 1911; Minneapolis, Minnesota, U.S.
- Occupations: philanthropist; social reformer; restaurateurs
- Spouse: Dexter Russell (m. 1854; died 1861)

Elizabeth Augusta Russell (née, Sawtell; known in the press as Mrs. E. A. Russell; 1832–1911) was an American philanthropist, reformer, and restaurateur. She served as National Superintendent of coffee house work for the Woman's Christian Temperance Union (WCTU) and was the founder of the Russell Coffee House in Minneapolis, Minnesota, which, in its day, was the largest coffeehouse in the city.

== Early life and education ==
Elizabeth Augusta Sawtell was born in Mason, New Hampshire, on October 3, 1832. Her father and mother were Yankees, the father from Rindge, New Hampshire, and the mother from Ashburnham, Massachusetts. Her father was a farmer and she was one of a family of ten.

She was educated in the common schools of her town and later, paid her own way through school at the New Ipswich Academy in New Ipswich, New Hampshire. She was trained in habits of industry, morals and the severe theologies of the day, after the belief of the Congregationalists.

== Career ==
She taught in New Hampshire schools for four or five years and in the fall of 1860, went to Florence, Alabama to teach in the Florence Synodical Female College, a large Presbyterian school with a boarding house annex for the resident pupils.

=== American Civil War ===
During the Battle of Big Bethel, she returned to her home in the North. After a short stay at home, she went to New York City with the intention of fitting herself by further study for a higher position as a teacher. This did not occur as soldiers wounded in the First Battle of Bull Run were being brought in and needed care. At first, her family took in two soldiers in its home. Then Russell, her mother and her sister began providing care ti the sick and wounded at 194 Broadway, known as the New England Soldiers' Relief Association. On retirement of the matron, sent by Governor Andrews from Massachusetts, Russell was appointed to succeed her. She was 26 years old at the time and remained as matron of the Association until the close of the war. the matron's salary was small and Russell was often at a loss for means to relieve the many cases which appealed to her and for which the government at that time had made no provision. The Association was the first provision made for the wounded soldiers, David's Island and Bedloe's Island being opened later. the wounded came by rail and by boat, from a dozen to 200 or more at a time. Russell wsa resident matron of this place for nearly five years. She was not mustered out until the close of the war, During those years in the hospital, she did not content herself with a superficial knowledge. She visited Washington, D.C. to study hospital methods. After the close of the war, her services were recognized by a pension grant.

=== Post-war ===
At the close of the war, she was employed as a teacher in New Orleans by the Freedmen's Bureau. She had entire charge of the Colored Orphan Asylum in New Orleans.

Her next position was that of matron of a soldiers' home at Togus Springs, near Augusta, Maine. Here she remained four years. The building burned during her term of service but there was no loss of life. Russell accompanied 30 of the more helpless of the inmates to Augusta where they found shelter in the town hall until another building could be obtained.

After a brief service in the post office in Boston, she became matron of the Continental Hotel in Philadelphia, Pennsylvania, a position she held eight years, including the year of the nation's centennial anniversary. Here she had her first experience in managing a large force of domestic help, making a success of it from the first.

In 1879, she left Philadelphia for a year of recreation in Europe. In company with a woman who was an old friend, she visited Naples, Florence, Rome, and London, but before the year was up, she was summoned to take charge of the Grand Union Hotel at Saratoga Springs, New York, and later, had a similar position in A. T. Stewart's Hotel in Park Avenue, New York. She remained here two years, and spent the two following summers as matron of the Oriental Hotel in Manhattan Beach, Brooklyn, New York. She next went to the Neil House in Columbus, Ohio, which later she left for the West Hotel in Minneapolis, Minnesota, remaining at the West four years.

It was about the year 1888 when, being called to open and manage a coffee house in Minneapolis in the interest of the WCTU, she felt that the opportunity of her life to do good had come. The enterprise was in many ways a success. The place was attractive, the table appointments were dainty, the food was the best obtainable. The attendants were young people, students at high school or college; these, in return for their hours of service, learned the civilities of life and received substantial help in paying their school expenses. On Sundays, the place was closed to the public. Russell made restaurant living not only respectable but popular. Her place had a national reputation. There was nothing really like it in the U.S. Minneapolis was at that time a city of only about 15,000, and the coffee house guests averaged 2,500 a day. For five years, she conducted this establishment, when she reluctantly left it.

At the National WCTU's convention in 1891, she was made National Superintendent of coffeehouse work. In this role, she collected statistics for her report on the coffee houses of the U.S. During the World's Columbian Exposition of 1893, she was in charge of the management of the World's Fair Temperance Hotel, located in Harvey, Illinois.

On March 7, 1894, in Minneapolis, at 23 Fourth Street South, she opened the Russell Coffee House, which was conducted along the same lines as the WCTU's Central Coffee House.

== Personal life ==
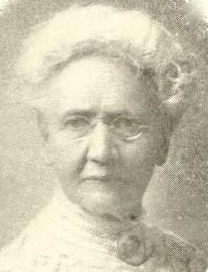
c. 1910

In Worcester, Massachusetts, on November 24, 1854, she married Dexter Russell (1826–1861). All her married life was spent in Ashburnham, Massachusetts. Her husband and many of her family are buried there.

In 1902, Russell was noted to be a proponent of absolute fasting, doing so for three weeks and three days at a time. She fasted for the sole purpose of reducing weight, noting that she found fasting very beneficial in numerous ways.

From 1905, she made her winter residence in Miami, Florida where she sustained a severe fall in the spring of 1910 from which she never recovered. Elizabeth Augusta Russell died January 7, 1911 in Minneapolis.
