= Florence Synodical Female College =

Women's school in Florence, Alabama (1854–1896)

Florence Synodical Female College (predecessor, Florence Female Academy; 1854 - before 1900) was a 19th-century American girls' boarding school in Florence, Alabama. This was for many years one of the largest and most popular of the many colleges for girls in the South.

== Establishment ==
When the town of Florence was laid out, The Cypress Land Company gave two large lots in the center of the town for school buildings-one for boys and one for girls. On the one donated for a girls' school the citizens built a large, rather imposing structure surrounded by a board colonnade whose colonial columns were two stories high. In this building, the Synodical Female College commenced its existence in October 1854. It was chartered December 13, 1855; the bill was vetoed by Governor Winston, but passed by the constitutional majority.

The incorporators were William Mitchell, Robert M. Patton, James Irvine, Richard W. Walker, Sydney C. Posey, Neal Rowell, Thos. Kirkman, Samuel D. Weakly, Charles Gookin, Benjamin F. Foster, John S. Kennedy, William K. Key, Benjamin Taylor, Boyles E. Bourland, John T. Edgar, A. Smith, A. A. Doak, and R. B. McMillan. These trustees were empowered to hold real and personal property in trust in perpetuity for use of said college and for the Presbyterian Synod of Nashville, Tennessee, and all powers concerning property usually conferred upon trustees were granted to this board; also all legal title to property heretofore donated or conveyed to the Synod of Nashville by the president and trustees of the Florence Female Academy or by the mayor and aldermen of Florence, or by any others, was vested in the President and Trustees of Florence Synodical Female College. In addition, the power was given to confer diplomas upon graduating pupils, and to do all other necessary and proper things for the promotion of education in said college.

== History ==
For many years, this was one of the largest and most popular of the many colleges for girls in the South. At the time, there were no Southern teachers, except men; therefore, all the teachers in this school, except the president, were Northern women. When the teachers were satisfactory, they were oftentimes retained for years. There was always a large class in art. The pupils were taught how to spell and read.

The first president, Mr. Stebbin, was connected with the school for several years. He was followed by a Mr. Nicholls, who was a terror to the girls; is stay was short. The next president was Mr. Rogers from Georgia. He presided during the prosperous years of the school. During this time every department was conducted by competent teachers. There was a German professor of music, Professor Neumayer, with competent assistants. The piano, violin, guitar, pipe organ, and harp were skilfully taught. The frequent musicals and concerts given in the chapel were enjoyed by large and appreciative audiences. Light operas were rendered, when the girls dressed in the required costumes. A native Frenchman, Monsieur De Soto, taught French, and creditable recitations were given, and compositions read in French, at the entertainments of the school, and these were frequent. The president of the board of trustees was Hon. Robert M. Patton, afterward Governor.

Dr. Rogers resigned the presidency on account of the ill health of his wife, and was succeeded by Dr. William N. Mitchell, who had been for many years the Presbyterian minister in Florence. The school was large and flourishing under his administration, until his health failed and he resigned. Mr. J. S. Anderson next took charge, and had a large school of girls from all over the South; however, he remained only a few years and resigned and bought property in Huntsville, Alabama and for many years had a large and flourishing school in that city. Mr. Frierson succeeded as president. The school did not prosper under his administration. His health failed and he remained only a short time. Dr. Bardwell then took charge. He was a Presbyterian minister, and very acceptable as a teacher and presiding officer, but his health failed and in a year or two he died. The trustees made a decided departure from the long established custom of electing a minister to preside over the school, and next elected Miss Sally Collier president.

The school continued during the American Civil War, as the invading armies did not enter that portion of the State.

During the Reconstruction period the school began to decline; and the trustees, anxious to restore it to its pristine greatness, decided that an addition to the first building would be advantageous. They borrowed money to make the improvement, and thus encumbered the property with debt, which they were unable to liquidate.

After the 1872 establishment of the State Normal in Florence (now part of the University of North Alabama), and the public school, the attendance at the Synodical College steadily decreased until it was thought advisable to close the doors forever. The last newspaper announcement regarding the institution's new school year occurred on September 3, 1896.

== Notable people ==
- Elizabeth Augusta Russell (1832–1911), faculty member, Florence Synodical Female College; philanthropist, reformer, and restaurateur
