= New England Soldiers' Relief Association =

New England Soldiers' Relief Association was an organization formed during the American Civil War with the purpose, "To aid and care for all sick and wounded soldiers passing through the City of New York on their way to or from the War." It was established by Sons of New England resident in the City of New York, through the parents organization, New England Society of New York. The formal organization of the Association was completed April 3, 1862, and on April 8, the building No. 194 Broadway was opened to the reception of beneficiaries, serving as a home and a hospital. The Association closed on September 1, 1865.

== History ==
Soon after the outbreak of the civil war, the New England Society of New York became the nucleus of a wider and less formal organization-the Sons of New England. In April 1862, these men formed the New England Soldiers' Relief Association, whose object was declared to be "to aid and care for all sick and wounded soldiers passing through the city of New York, on their way to or from the war." On April 8, its "Home," a building well adapted to its purposes, was opened on Broadway, and Dr. Everett Herrick, was appointed its resident Surgeon. The Home was a hospital as well as a home, and in its second floor accommodated a very considerable number of patients.

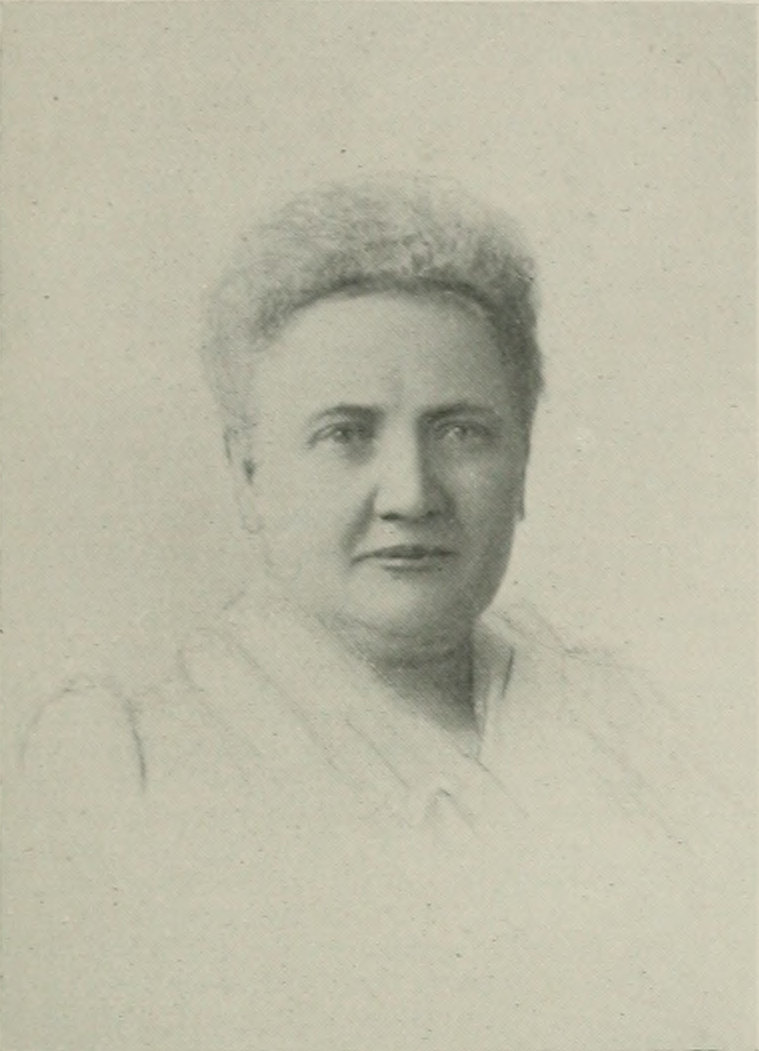
Elizabeth Augusta Russell, Matron

Elizabeth Augusta Russell was appointed Matron. She was 26 years old at the time and remained as matron of the Association until the close of the war. The matron's salary was small and Russell was often at a loss for means to relieve the many cases which appealed to her and for which the government at that time had made no provision. The Association was the first provision made for the wounded soldiers, David's Island and Bedloe's Island being opened later. The wounded came by rail and by boat, from a dozen to 200 or more at a time. In the three years that she provided her service, she had under her care more than 60,000 soldiers, many of them wounded or disabled.

Frank E. Howe was appointed Superintendent of the rooms and offices provided for the use of the Association by resolution of the Managers, passed April 3, 1862. The building No. 194 Broadway was selected for the use of the Association on account of its central location, its convenience to the routes of travel by which disabled soldiers arrived in the city, and for its easy and cheap adaptation to the wants of the Association.

The average number accommodated per month, during the first year of operation was 1,380. The average per day was 46. The largest number kept for a single night was 287. No limit was placed to the period for which soldiers were permitted to remain. Some were received through dangerous illnesses and tedious convalescence.

Until the month of August 1863, the Association received all the wounded soldiers it could accommodate. No distinction was made by Government between the Association and the various depots for sick and wounded men established in New York and its vicinity. In August, however, an order was made, forbidding all sick and disabled soldiers, not furloughed or discharged, from receiving other than Government care, and we were able to aid thereafter only such as had been actually discharged from service, or furloughed, or were on their way to rejoin their regiments.

== Architecture and fittings ==
The Association occupied the second, third, fourth and fifth stories of the building, which was 25 by 175 feet (7.6 m × 53.3 m) in dimensions. It was thoroughly ventilated and lighted. The ground floor and basement were occupied by the Superintendent for his private business; the entire building being rented for US$4,000 per annum, of which the Superintendent paid US$2,000. The first story was used as a reception and baggage room, and for the office of the Association. The reception room was used at night for a sleeping room, and in the office were the closets and store rooms for clothing and supplies of that description. The second story contained the "sick ward." The first half was devoted to convalescents, and the rear half exclusively to cases of serious illness and to surgical cases. The apartment of the Resident Physician and Surgeon, and the medical storeroom were on this floor. The third story was a grand Dormitory. It contains 86 beds. The upper story contained the dining hall, the kitchen, pantries, laundry and wash room. Each floor was furnished with supplies of water, in bathrooms, water closets and wash stands. The laundry was fitted with the necessary conveniences for washing bed linen and soldiers' garments.

At the opening of these rooms, private sources provided many articles essential to the fitting of them. The United States, through the agency of Dr. R. I. Satterlee, Medical Purveyor, provided a large quantity of hospital bedding, beds, cups, and litters. The United States Sanitary Commission also provided supplies.

From benevolent and soldiers' relief societies, and from town and church organizations and individuals in the Eastern States and in New York, a host of articles were received-among them second-hand clothing, shirts, stockings, drawers, undershirts, brandies, wines, fruits, pickles, jellies, lint, bandages, crutches, and slippers.

== Administration ==
The Association was indebted to Colonel John H. Almy, Military Agent of the States of Connecticut and Rhode Island, for his time and business attainments. He and the Corresponding Secretary of the Association, Major William H. L. Barnes, assisted in the preparation of documents and reports relating to the Association. The administration of the Association was led by Dr. Everett Herrick, Resident Physician and Surgeon. The business department of the Association included the services of Major George Browne and the Messrs. Downing. Elizabeth Augusta Russell, Matron, had under her immediate charge all the "housekeeping" affairs.

A Women's Auxiliary Committee was formed soon after the establishment of the Association, consisting of 30 women who took their turn of service as nurses for the sick and wounded through the year, and provided for them additional luxuries and delicacies to those furnished by the Association and the Government rations. These women were the wives and daughters of merchants, clergymen, physicians, and lawyers of the city. The women, in addition to their services as nurses, took part in a choir for the Sabbath services, in which all the exercises were by volunteers.

The care of the sick and wounded men during the night, devolved the Night Watchers' Association, a voluntary committee of young men, who during a period of three years, supplied the needful watch over the invalid soldiers.

== See also ==
- New York in the American Civil War
