= Statue of George Washington (Wall Street) =

Bronze statue by John Quincy Adams Ward

George Washington
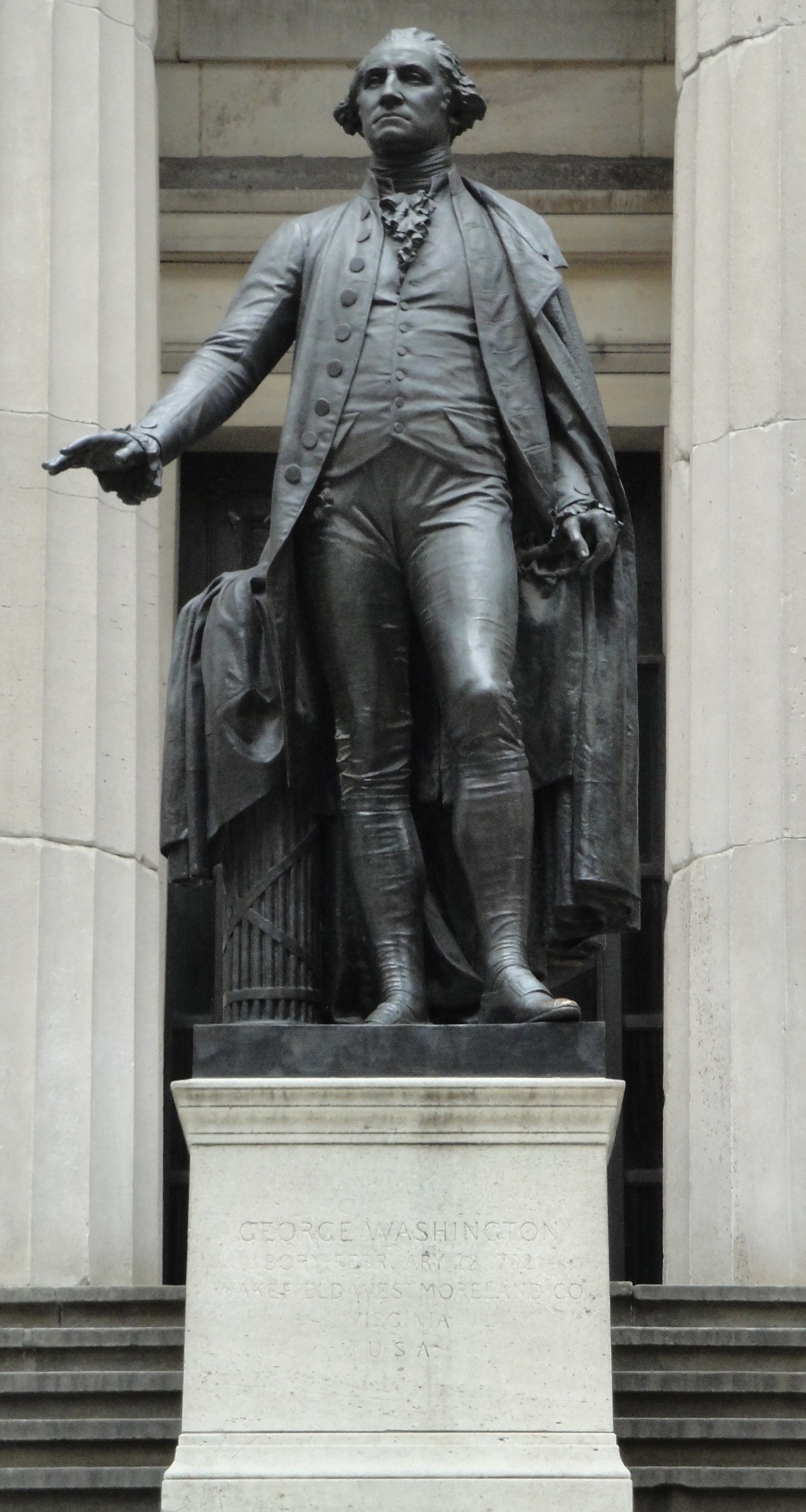
- The statue in 2010
- Artist: John Quincy Adams Ward
- Year: 1883
- Type: Sculpture
- Medium: Bronze
- Subject: George Washington
- Location: New York City, U.S.; 40.7074°N 74.0104°W

George Washington is a large bronze sculpture of George Washington by John Quincy Adams Ward, installed on the front steps of Federal Hall National Memorial on Wall Street in New York City.

== History ==
The statue was unveiled in 1883 to commemorate the first inauguration of George Washington. In 1789, Federal Hall, which served as the capitol building of the United States, stood on the Lower Manhattan site, and Washington took the oath of office on the balcony of that building, approximately where the statue now stands.

== Description ==
=== Inscription ===
The inscription on the base of the statue reads:

GEORGE WASHINGTON
BORN FEBRUARY 22, 1732
WAKEFIELD WESTMORELAND CO
VIRGINIA
U S A

== See also ==
- 1883 in art
- Cultural depictions of George Washington
- List of monuments dedicated to George Washington
- List of sculptures of presidents of the United States
- List of statues of George Washington
