= Gordon W. Burnham =

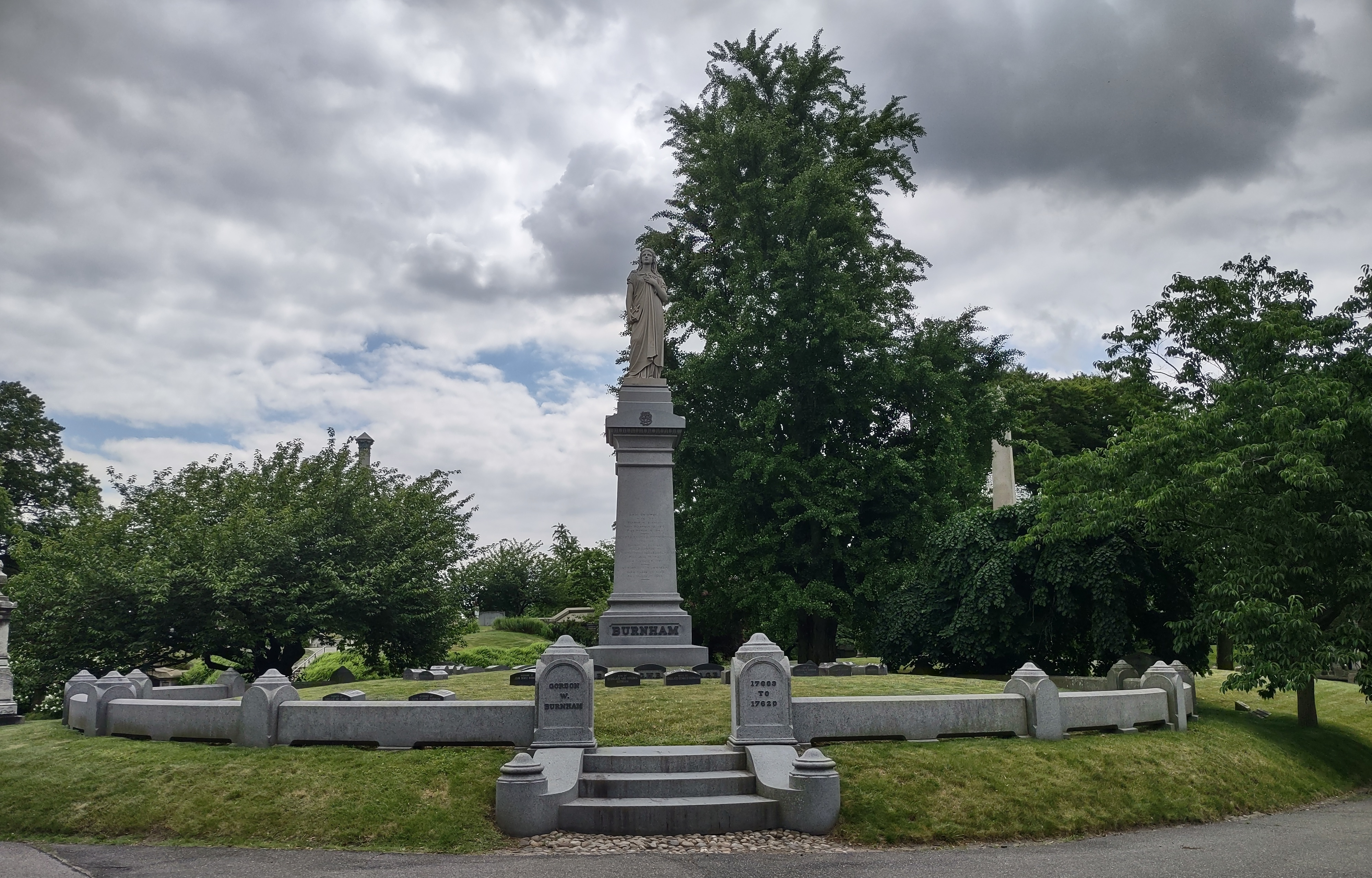
Family plot in Green-Wood Cemetery

Gordon Webster Burnham (1803 – 1885) was an American businessman.

== Early life and education ==
He was born in Hampton, Connecticut, the son of Jedediah Burnham and Phebe (Martin) Burnham.

== Career ==
Burnham was a successful businessman, involved in the brass industry in Waterbury, Connecticut, and in New York City.

== Legacy ==
He donated a large bronze statue of Thomas Church Brownell to Trinity College and the Statue of Daniel Webster (New York City) in Central Park in 1876.
