= Statue of Daniel Webster (New York City) =

Statue of Daniel Webster by Thomas Ball in Central Park, Manhattan, New York, U.S.

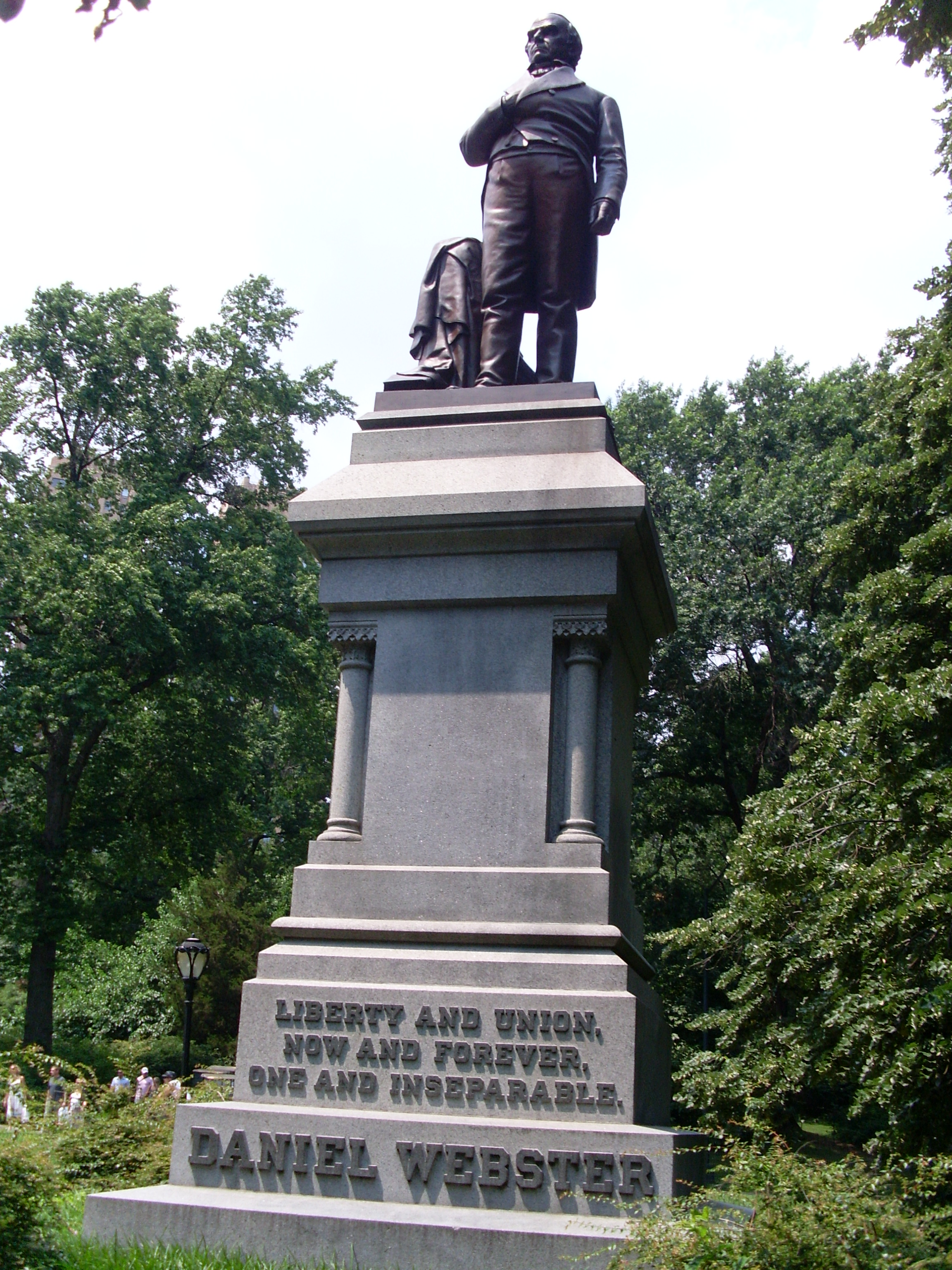
- The sculpture in 2008
- Artist: Thomas Ball
- Year: 1876
- Type: Sculpture
- Medium: Bronze
- Subject: Daniel Webster
- Location: 40.77475°N 73.97412°W

An outdoor bronze sculpture of Daniel Webster by Thomas Ball is installed in Central Park, Manhattan, New York. The "larger-than-life-size" statue was commissioned in the 1870s, to be installed along Central Park's Mall. It was instead installed along the West Drive at 72nd Street due to size restrictions. Daniel Webster was presented by Gordon W. Burnham in 1876.

== See also ==
- 1876 in art
