= J. Massey Rhind =

Scottish-American sculptor (1860–1936)

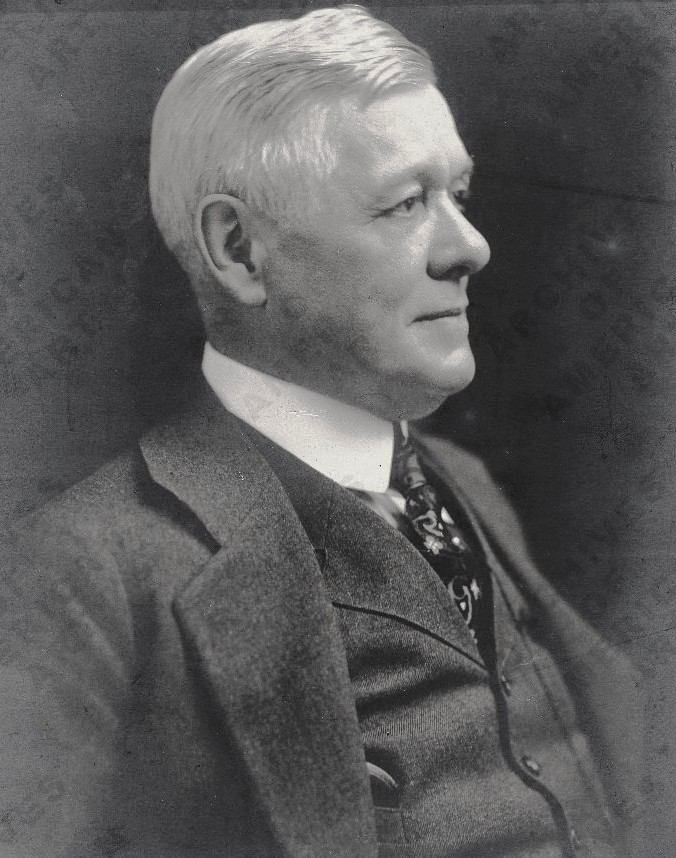
- J. Massey Rhind
- Born: 9 July 1858; Edinburgh, Scotland
- Died: 22 October 1936 (aged 78); Edinburgh, Scotland
- Known for: sculptor, educator

John Massey Rhind (9 July 1860 – 22 October 1936) was a Scottish-American sculptor. Among Rhind's better known works is the Stephenson Grand Army of the Republic Memorial and the marble statue of Dr. Crawford W. Long, located in the National Statuary Hall Collection, in Washington D.C. (1926).

== Early years ==
Born in Edinburgh, Rhind began his art studies under the tutorage of his father John Rhind, a respected and successful sculptor in the royal burgh. He studied at the Royal Scottish Academy, and continued his education with Jules Dalou, who was at that time living and teaching in Lambeth, England. He then moved to Paris to continue his education for two more years. Upon completing his training he considered moving to the United States but was cautioned by his father not to do so because, "There is no sculptural art in America... You'll starve."

In 1885 he established a studio with his elder brother William Birnie Rhind, at 217 West George Street, Glasgow, but his brother moved back to Edinburgh 2 years later. At age 29, J. Massey Rhind finally emigrated to the United States in 1889 and settled in New York City. In 1899, Rhind set up a studio and sculpture yard and began residing in Closter, New Jersey. In 1917 Rhind was elected to the Salmagundi Club New York as an Artist member, remaining so until his death.

== Career ==
In February 1890 John Jacob Astor III died and shortly thereafter a competition to create three sets of bronze doors dedicated to him for Trinity Church, New York was announced. Rhind entered the competition, and, along with Charles Niehaus and Karl Bitter, was awarded one of the sets of doors. After this success he never lacked for work and was to generate a large number of public monuments and architectural projects. Nevertheless, Rhind still found time for smaller, private pieces such as a bust of Theodore Roosevelt.

=== Gettysburg Battlefield ===
- Alexander S. Webb, 1915
- Abner Doubleday, 1917
- John Cleveland Robinson, 1917
- Francis C. Barlow, 1922

=== Public monuments ===
==== Washington, D.C. ====
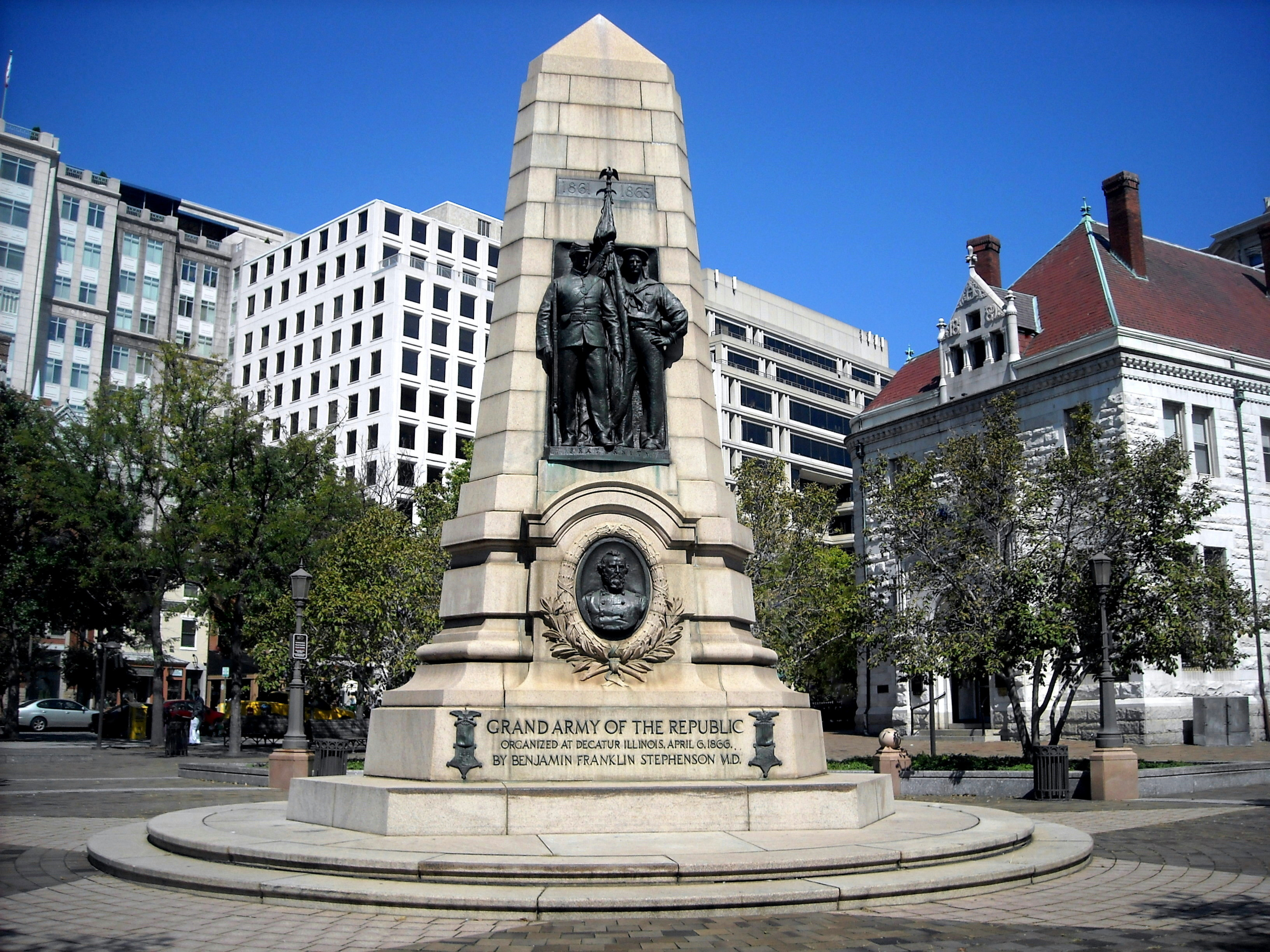
Grand Army of the Republic Memorial in Washington, D.C.

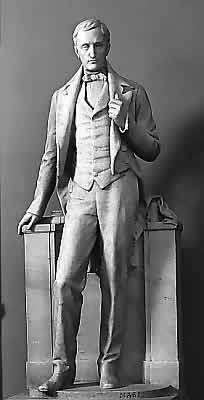
Marble statue of Dr. Crawford W. Long in the National Statuary Hall Collection in Washington D.C. (1926)

==== Nova Scotia ====
Nova Scotia

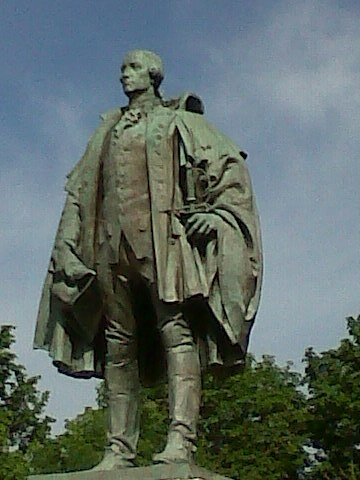
Edward Cornwallis, Halifax, Nova Scotia

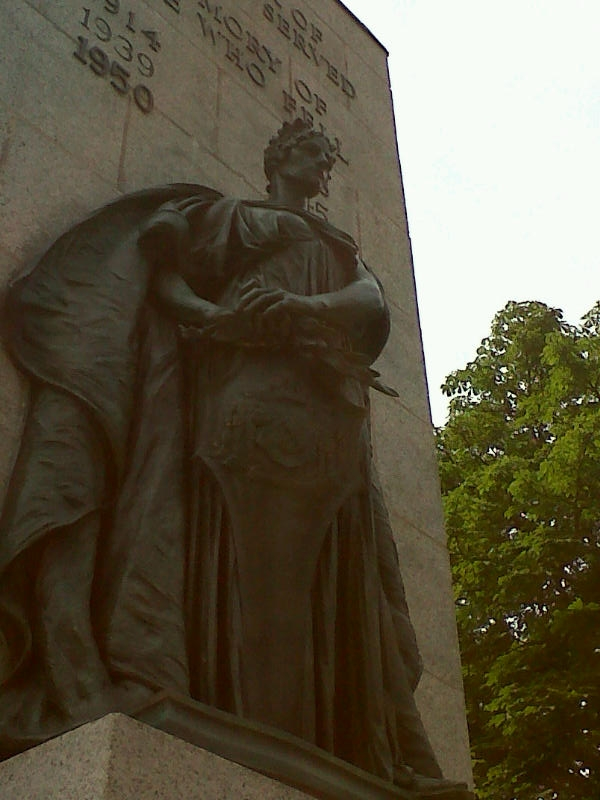
Britannia, Grand Parade, Nova Scotia

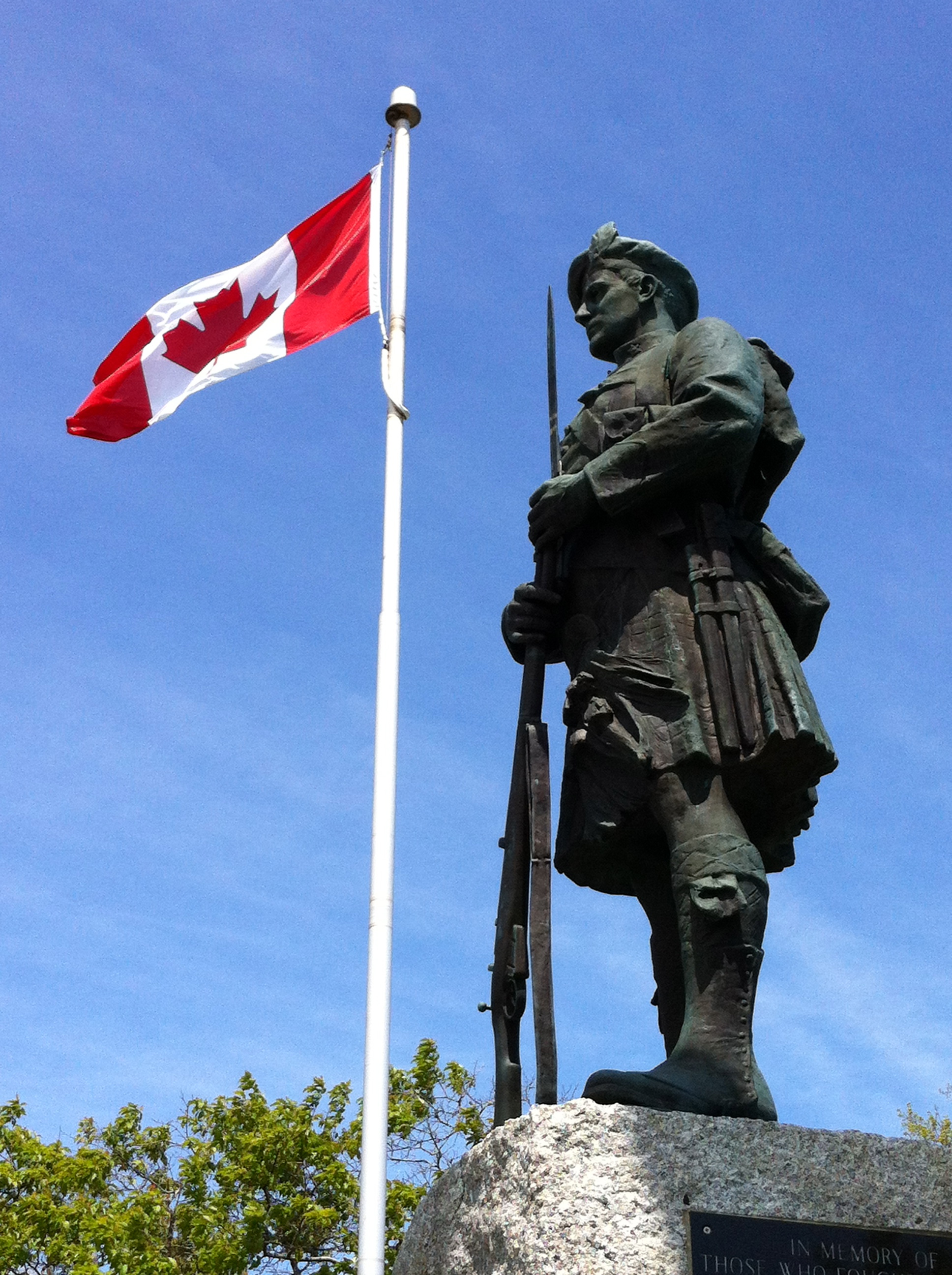
Nova Scotia Highland soldier, Chester, Nova Scotia

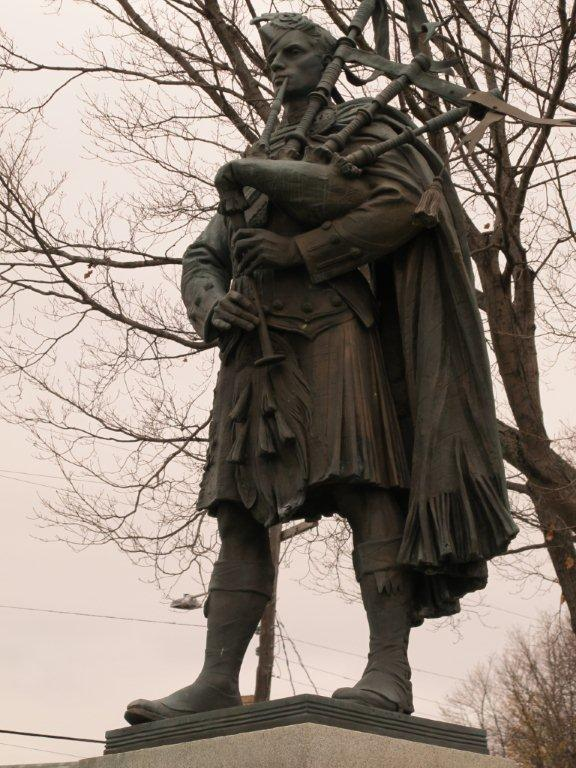
Highland soldier, New Glasgow, Nova Scotia

==== New York and New Jersey ====
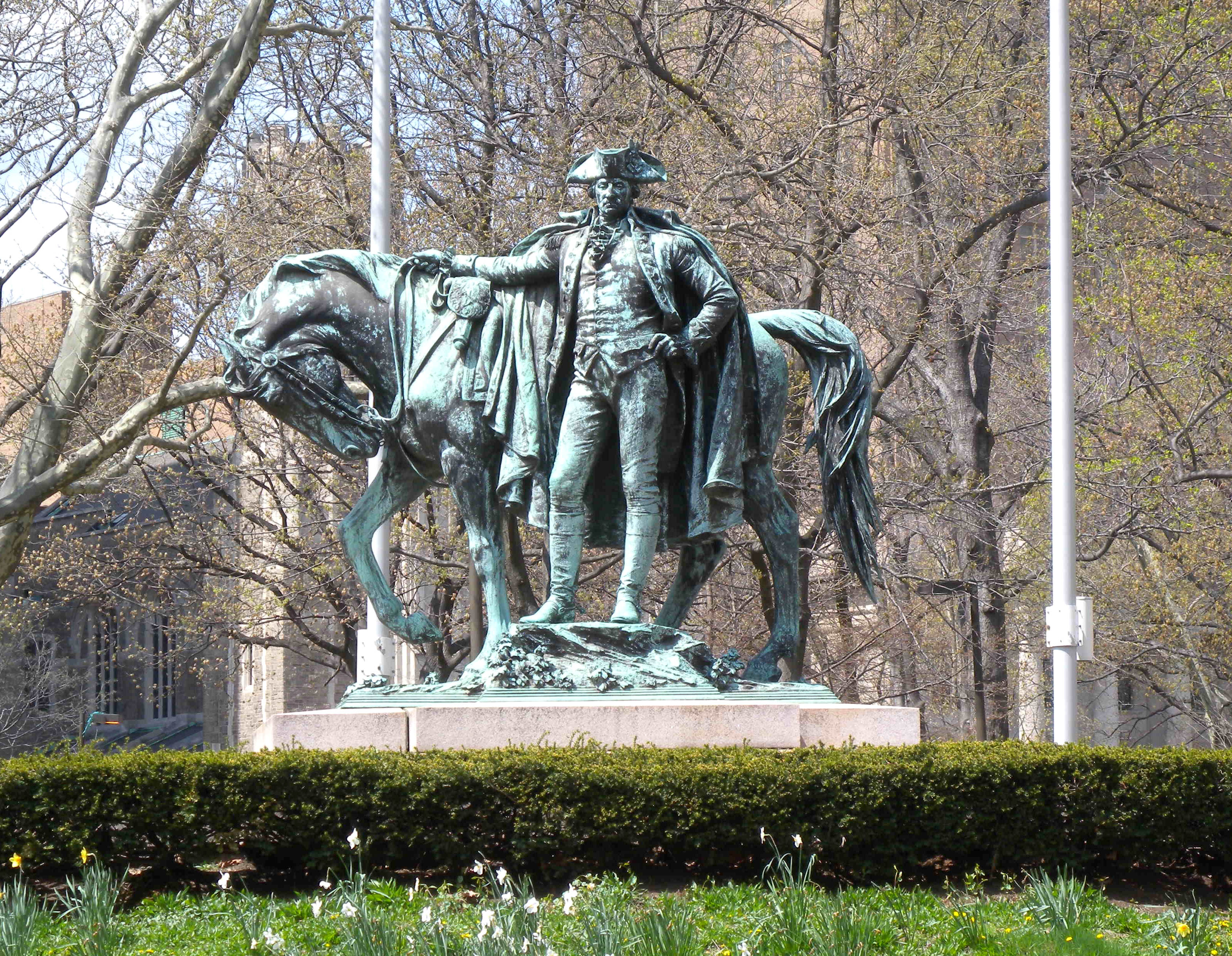
George Washington
Washington Park
Newark, New Jersey

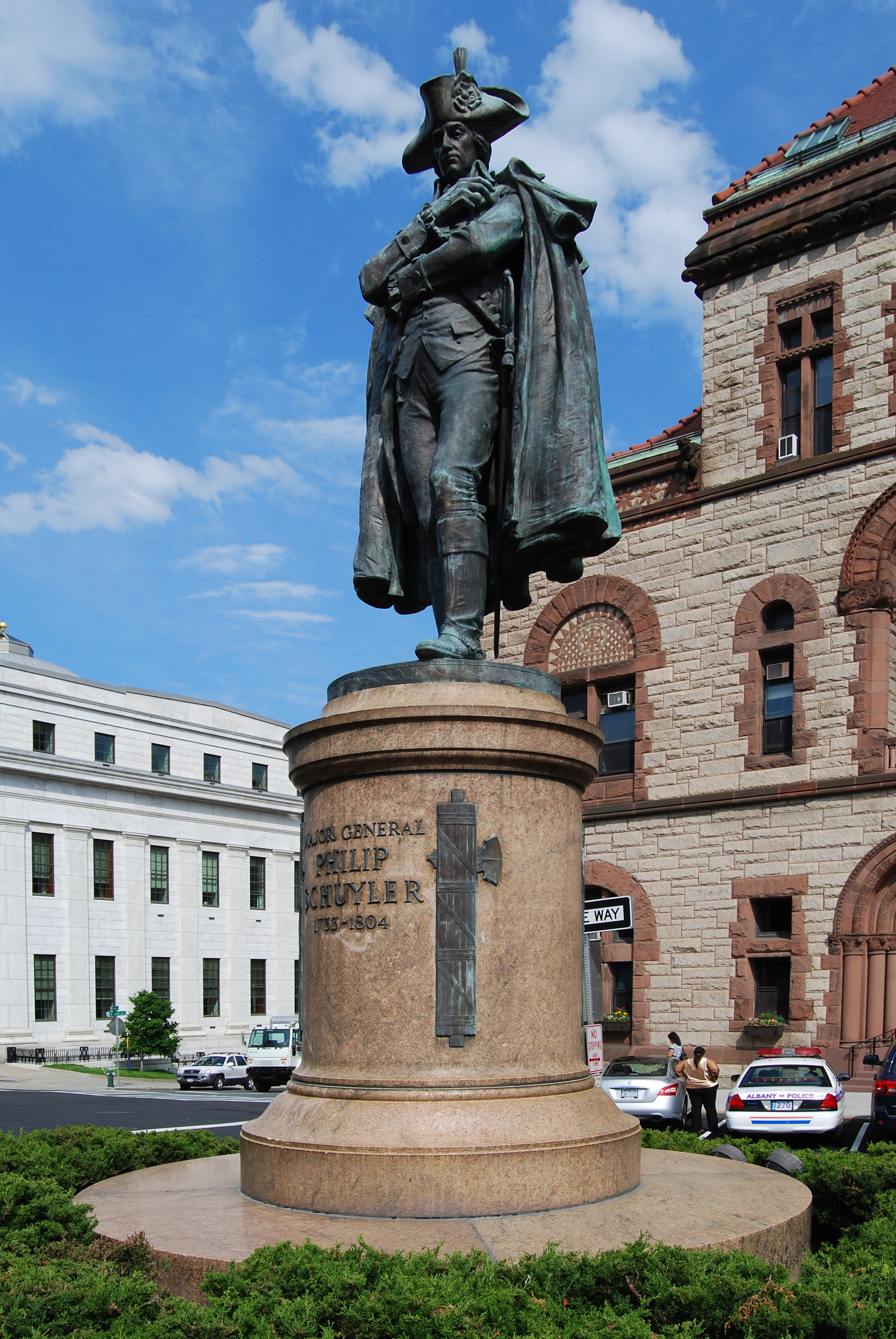
Philip Schuyler
Albany, New York

==== Other ====
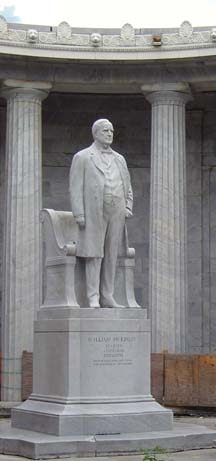
National McKinley Birthplace Memorial,
Niles, Ohio

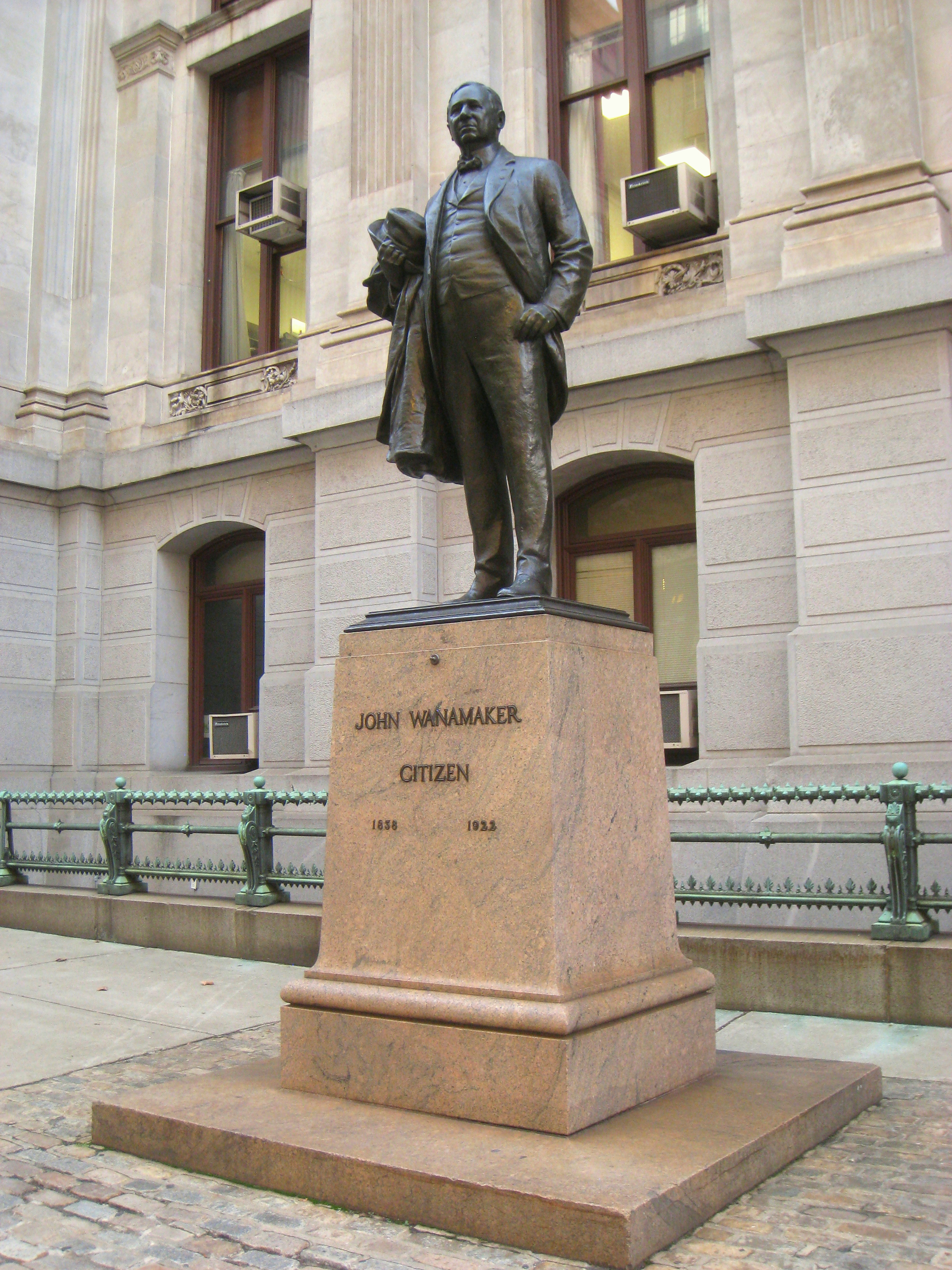
John Wanamaker, statue identified as "Citizen"

- Stephen Girard statue at the Museum of Art in Philadelphia, Pennsylvania
- John Wanamaker statue at the City Hall (east plaza) in Philadelphia, Pennsylvania
- Teedyuscung statue, Wissahickon Creek, Philadelphia, Pennsylvania 1902
- Civil War Soldiers & Sailors Monument on Franklin Parkway in Philadelphia, Pennsylvania
- John C. Calhoun Monument, Charleston, South Carolina, 1896
- George Clinton Monument, Kingston, New York, 1898 (originally in New York City)
- Henry Hudson Monument, Kingston, New York, 1898 (originally in New York City )
- James Wolfe Monument, Calgary, Alberta, 1898 (originally in New York City )
- Peter Stuyvesant Monument
  Kingston, New York, 1898 (originally in New York City )
  Peter Stuyvesant Monument, Bergen Square, Jersey City, New Jersey, 1913
- Robert Burns Monument, Barre, Vermont, 1899,
  Pittsburgh, Pennsylvania, 1914
  Syracuse, New York, 1914
  Newark, New Jersey, 1914
- William T. Sherman Monument, Muskegon, Michigan, 1900
- Ulysses S. Grant Memorial, Muskegon, Michigan, 1900
- Soldiers' Monument (Port Chester, New York), 1900
- Statues of Samuel Colt, Colt Park, Hartford, Connecticut, 1902–06
- Alexander Skene, Grand Army Plaza, Brooklyn, NY 1905
- Grand Army of the Republic Memorial, Washington, D.C., 1909
- George Washington, Newark, New Jersey, 1914
- Bartolomeo Colleoni, reproduction of Andrea del Verrocchio's equestrian sculpture, Newark, New Jersey, 1914
- National McKinley Birthplace Memorial, Niles, Ohio, 1917
- Nova Scotia Highland soldier, Cenotaph, Chester, Nova Scotia, 1922
- Philip Schuyler, Albany, New York, 1925
- Britannia, Cenotaph, Grand Parade, Nova Scotia, 1929
- Nova Scotia Highland soldier, Cenotaph, New Glasgow, Nova Scotia, 1929
- Edward Cornwallis, Nova Scotia, 1931

=== Fountains ===
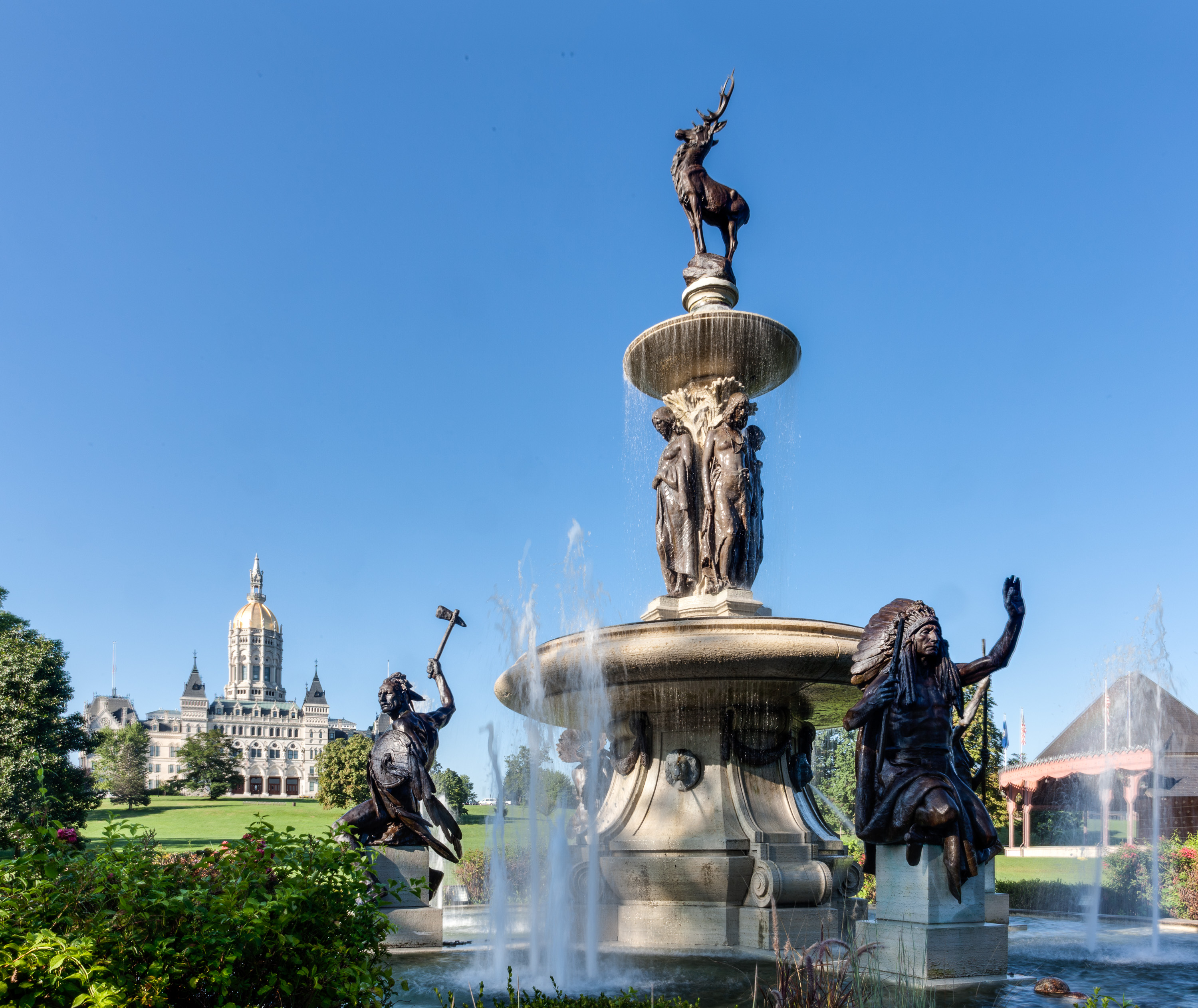
Corning Fountain, Bushnell Park, Hartford Connecticut.

- "Rufus H. King Memorial Fountain", Washington Park, Albany, New York, 1893: the theme, specified by King's son, J. Howard King: Moses strikes the rock at Horeb
- Corning Fountain, Bushnell Park, Hartford, Connecticut, 1899 bronze and granite, the fountain is 30 feet tall, with a statue of a deer in the middle surrounded by figures of Saukiog Indians, Hartford's first inhabitants.
- "Fountain of Apollo", Lakewood, New Jersey, 1902
- Erskine Memorial Fountain, Atlanta, Georgia, 1896

=== Architectural sculpture ===
==== New Haven County Court House ====
- New Haven County Court House, New Haven, Connecticut, 1914 (Architects: William Allen and Richard Williams), facing the New Haven Green.

==== Shelby County Court House ====
- Shelby County Court House, Memphis, Tennessee, 1906–1909 (architects, James Gamble Rogers and H. D. Hale)
Shelby County Court House

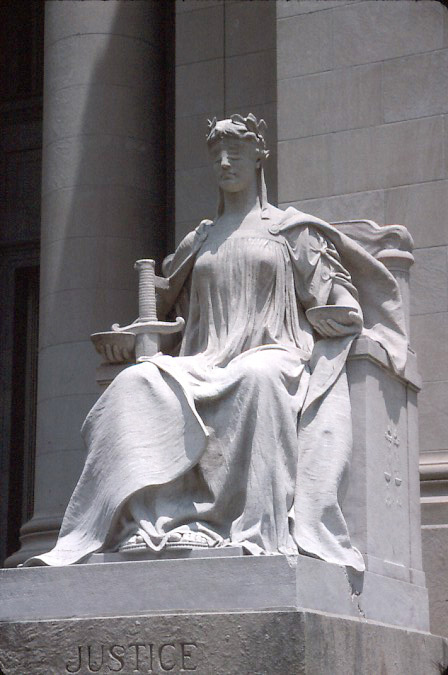
Justice

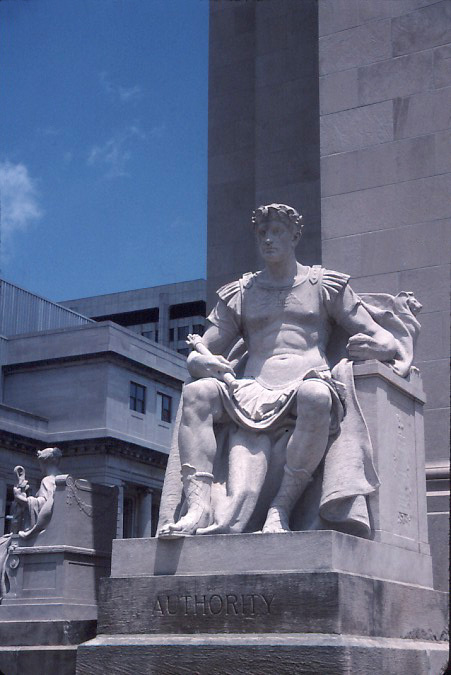
Authority

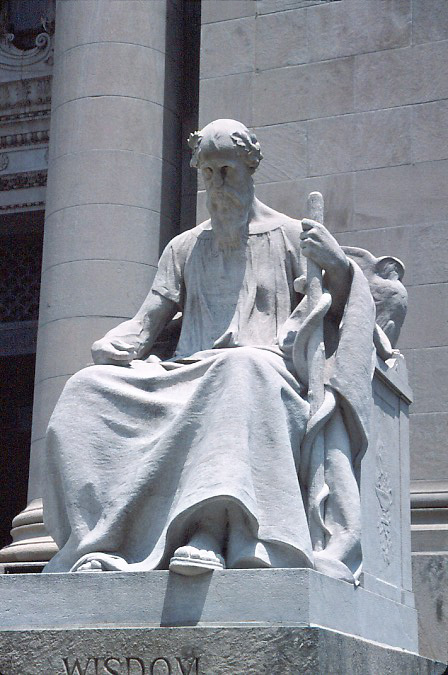
Wisdom

==== Detroit ====
Wayne County Building, Detroit
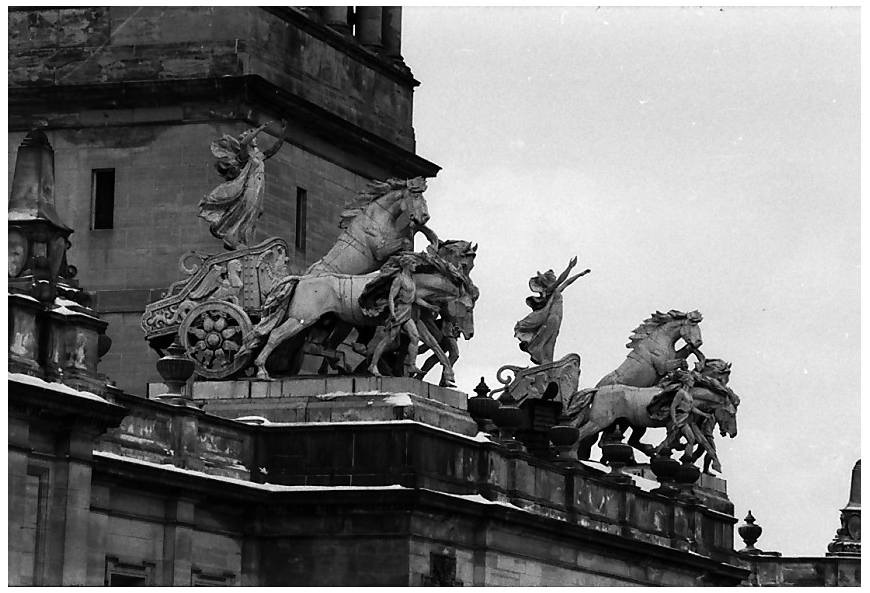
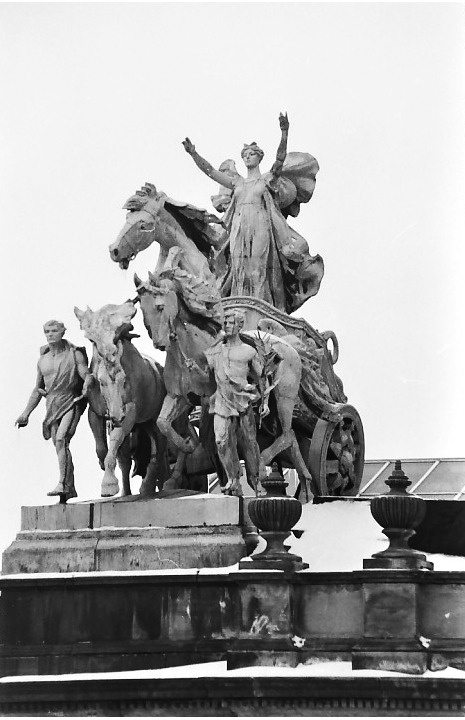
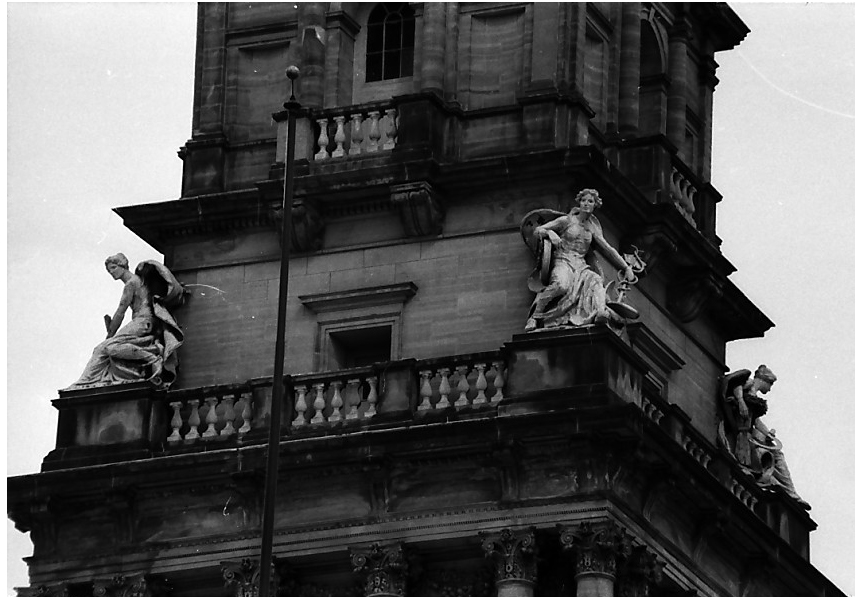

==== Other ====
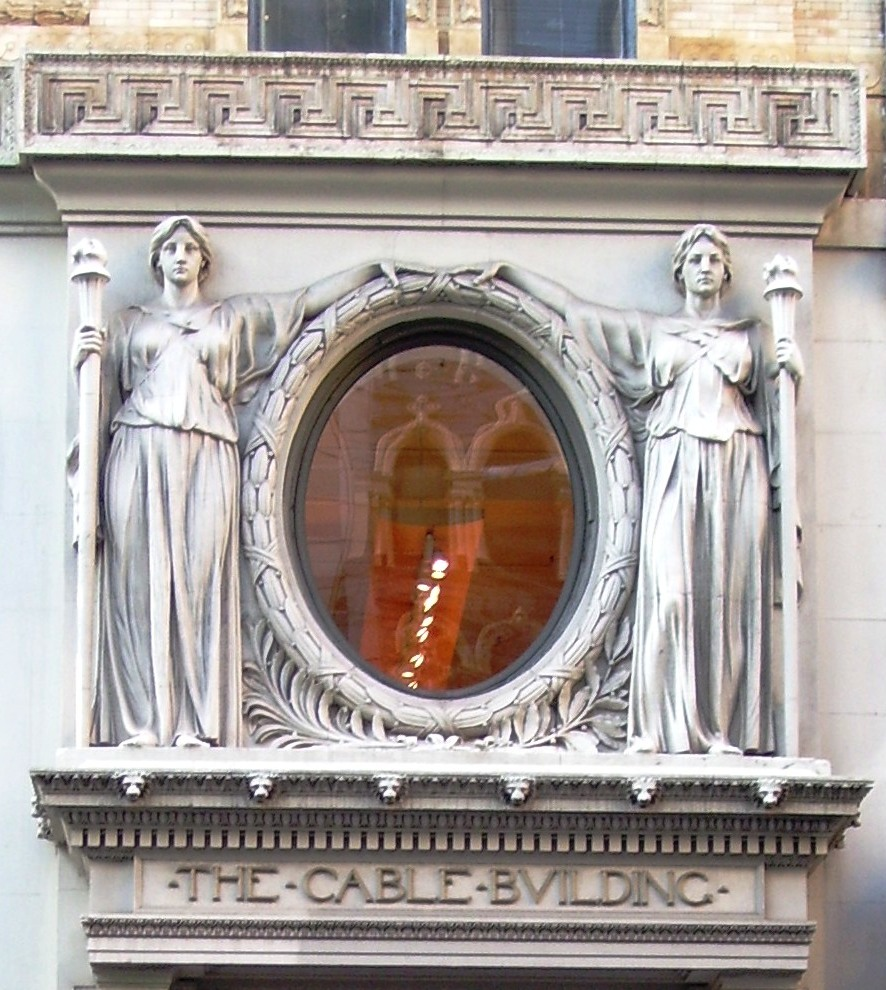
The Cable Building (New York City)

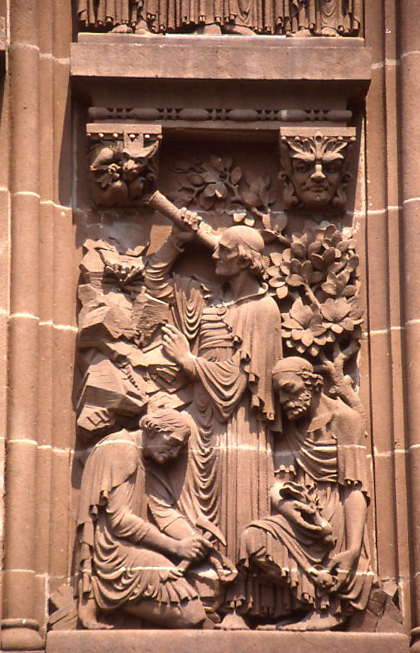
Alexander Hall sculpture, 1892, Princeton University

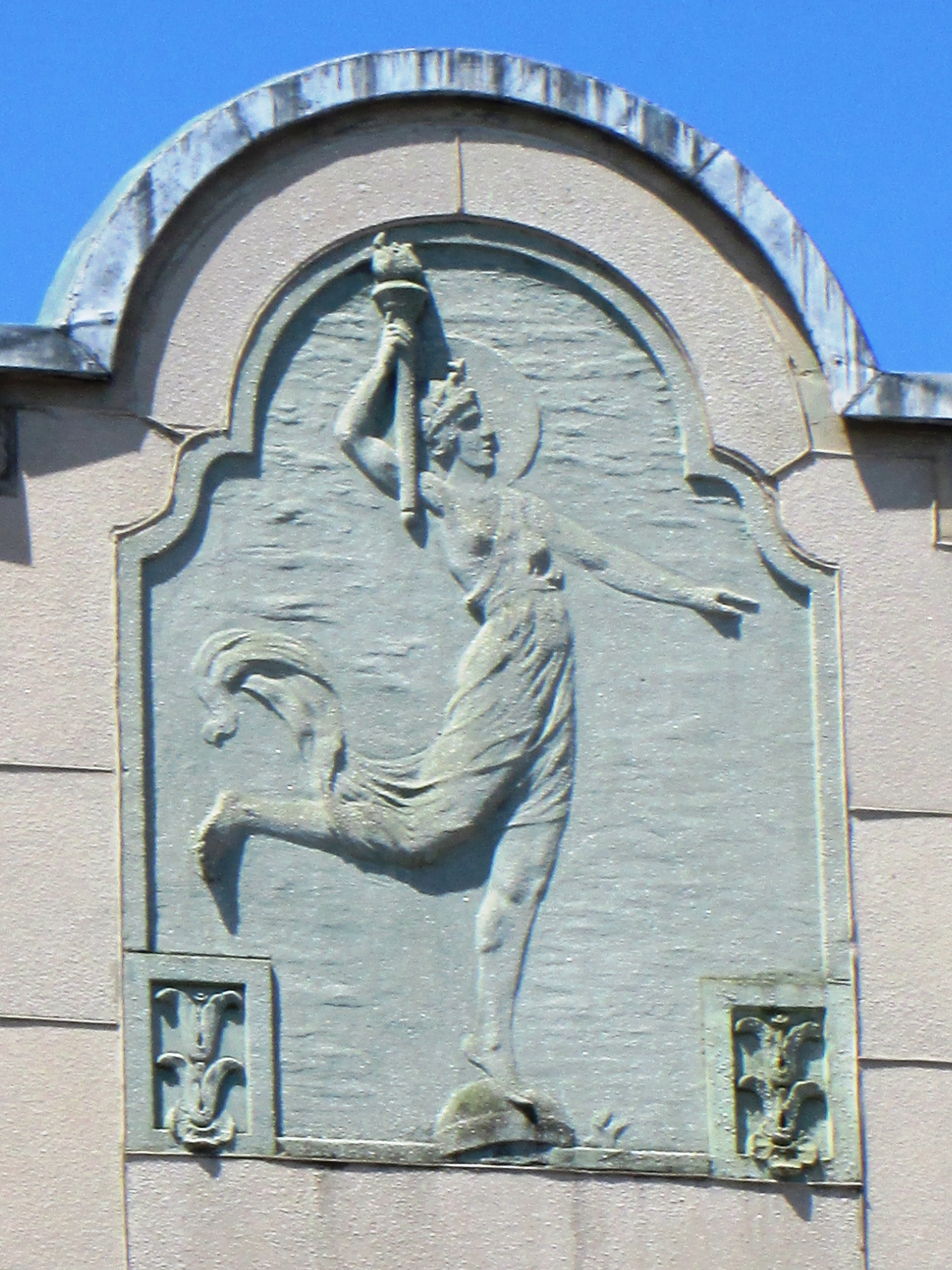
"Progress Lighting the Way for Commerce", designed for Montgomery Ward

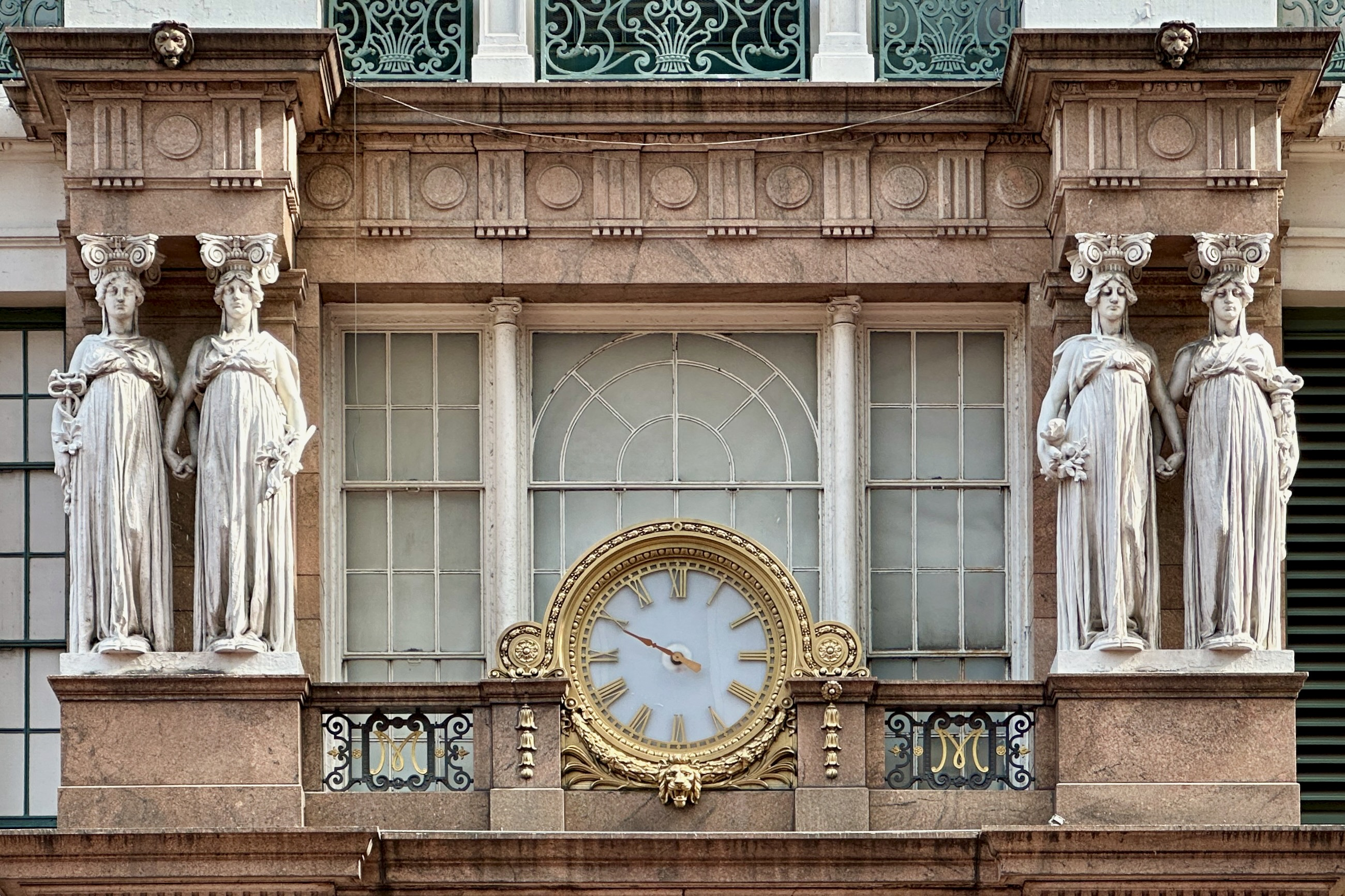
Macy's Caryatids, Macy's Herald Square, New York City
- Alexander Memorial Hall, Princeton University, Princeton, New Jersey, 1892
- The Cable Building, 611 Broadway at Houston Street, New York City, 1894
- American Surety Building (now Bank of Tokyo), 100 Broadway, figures at 3rd floor level, New York, 1895 (Architect: Bruce Price)
- Astor Memorial Doors, Trinity Church, New York, 1896
- East Pyne, Princeton University, Princeton, New Jersey, 1896
- "Victory" and "Peace", Grant's Tomb, New York City, 1897
- Macy's Caryatids, Macy's Herald Square, New York City, 1901
- "Victory" and "Progress", quadrigas (but with three horses instead of four), Wayne County Building, Detroit, Michigan, 1904
- United States Courthouse and Post Office, Indianapolis, Indiana, 1904
- Shelby County Court House, Memphis, Tennessee, 1906–1909
- Federal Building, Providence, Rhode Island, 1908
- "Apollo" and "Minerva" Butler Institute of American Art, Youngstown, Ohio
