= Crawford W. Long Museum =

Museum in Georgia (state)

Coordinates: 34°07′05″N 83°34′23″W

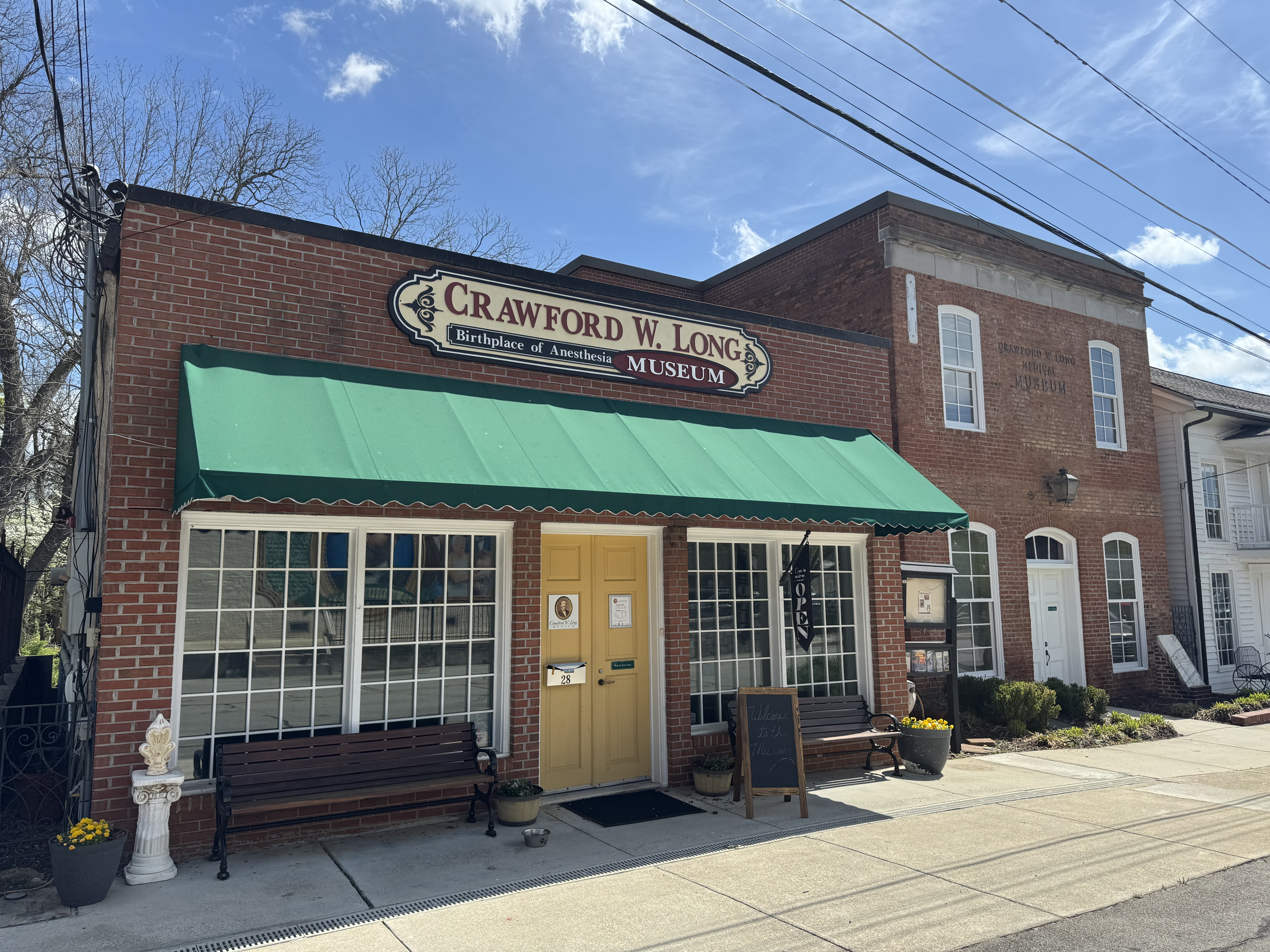
- The front of the museum in 2025
- Established: 1957
- Location: Jefferson, Georgia
- Type: Biographical Museum
- Director: Marena Bleech
- Chairperson: Curt Collier
- Website: crawfordlong.org

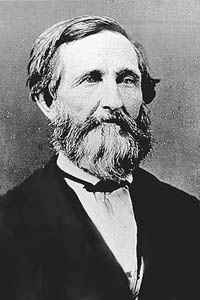
Crawford W. Long

The Crawford W. Long Museum is a history museum in downtown Jefferson, Georgia that is dedicated to the life and career of Crawford W. Long. It has been in operation since 1957. A recreated general store and 1840's doctor's office apothecary can be viewed within the museum.
