= Edward Wagner =

German-American sculptor

Edward Q Wagner (1855, Germany – 1922, Detroit, United States) was a German-American sculptor.

== Early years ==
Wagner had immigrated from Germany to the United States by 1871 settling in Detroit, Michigan. After arriving in Detroit he studied with Detroit sculptor Julius Melchers (father of painter Gari Melchers). He also studied in New York City.

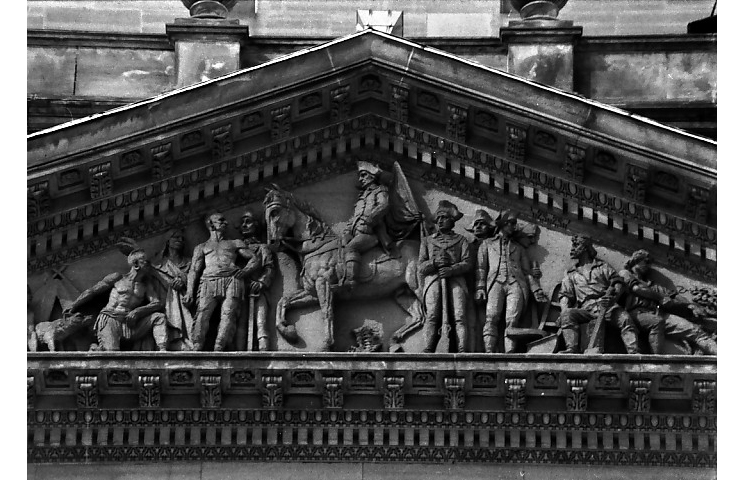
Pediment, Wayne County Building

As a sculptor in Detroit, he was involved in several partnerships, Wagner and Reuther (1885–1887) and Wagner and Volbracht (1890–1895). He and his various firms created wood carvings for churches as well as stone architectural commissions. His best known work is the architectural sculpture, notably the Anthony Wayne pediment, on the Wayne County Building, constructed from 1897 to 1902.

In 1906, Wagner entered a competition to create a statue of General Alexander Macomb for the city of Detroit. The judges for the contest were Charles F. McKim, Daniel H. Burnham, and Augustus Saint-Gaudens. It was won by New York City sculptor Adolph Alexander Weinman, who had both studied with and served as an assistant to St. Gaudens, Weinman had also created many commissions for McKim's, firm, McKim, Mead and White, and who certainly was better known to Burnham than was Wagner.

Wagner worked generating architectural sculpture at both the World's Columbian Exposition in Chicago in 1893 and the St. Louis Exposition in St. Louis in 1904.

He was employed by the government of Brazil and spent five years in Rio de Janeiro.

On August 17, 1937, the Detroit News, as part of a story "Contributions to Detroit Art Recalled by Barlow's Death" contained the following sentence:

Edward Wagner's sculpture adorned some of the most imposing buildings in far parts of the earth.
