= Statue of Crawford Long =

Statue in the U.S. Capitol

Crawford Long
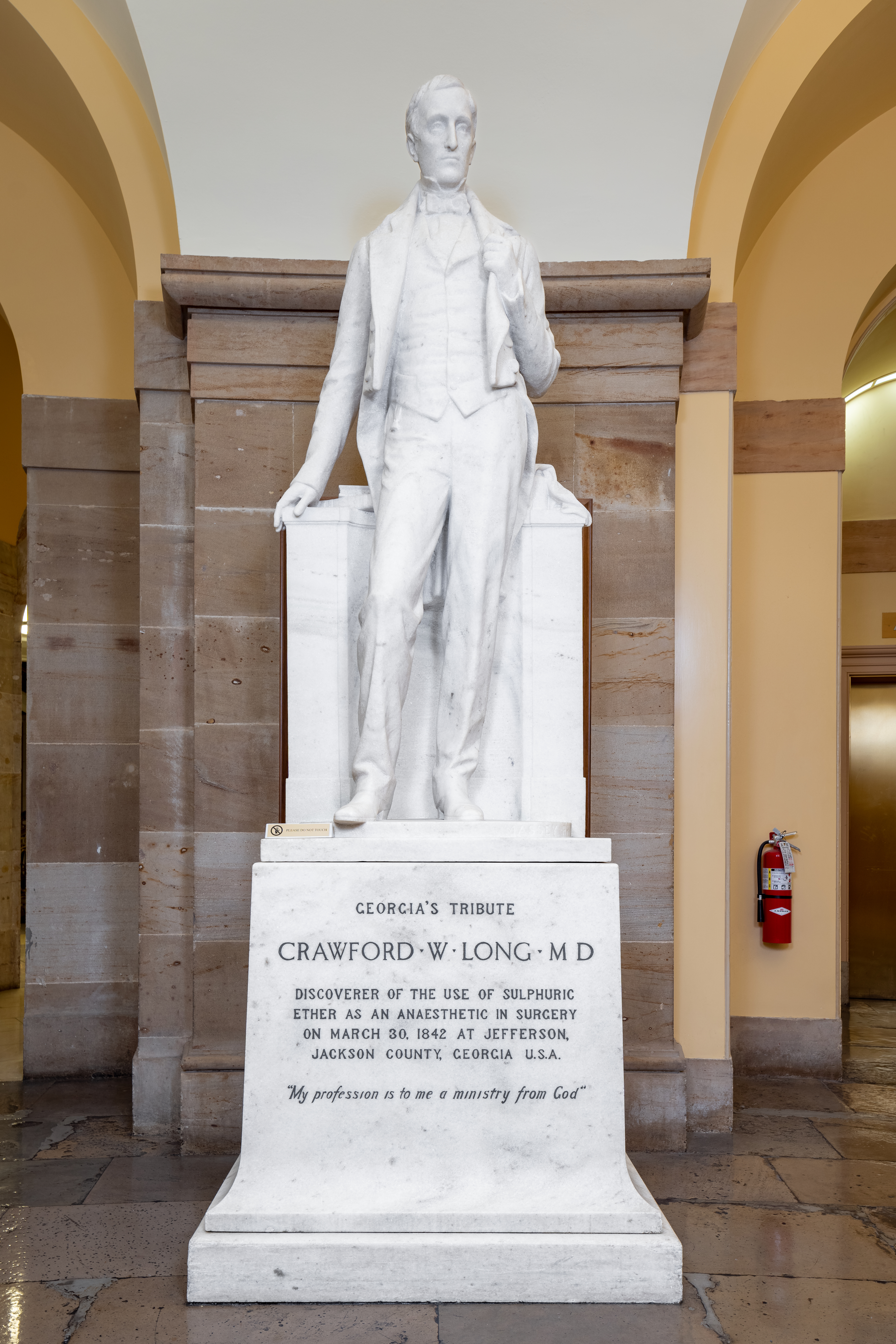
- The statue at the U.S. Capitol crypt in 2022
- Artist: J. Massey Rhind
- Year: 1926
- Medium: Marble sculpture
- Subject: Crawford Long
- Location: Washington, D.C., U.S.

Crawford Long is a 1926 marble sculpture depicting the American surgeon and pharmacist of the same name by J. Massey Rhind, installed in the United States Capitol, in Washington, D.C., as part of the National Statuary Hall Collection. It is one of two statues donated by the U.S. state of Georgia.

The work was unveiled on March 30, 1926.

As befitted the subject, Rhind had the statue carved from Georgia marble by Georgia sculptor James K. Watt.

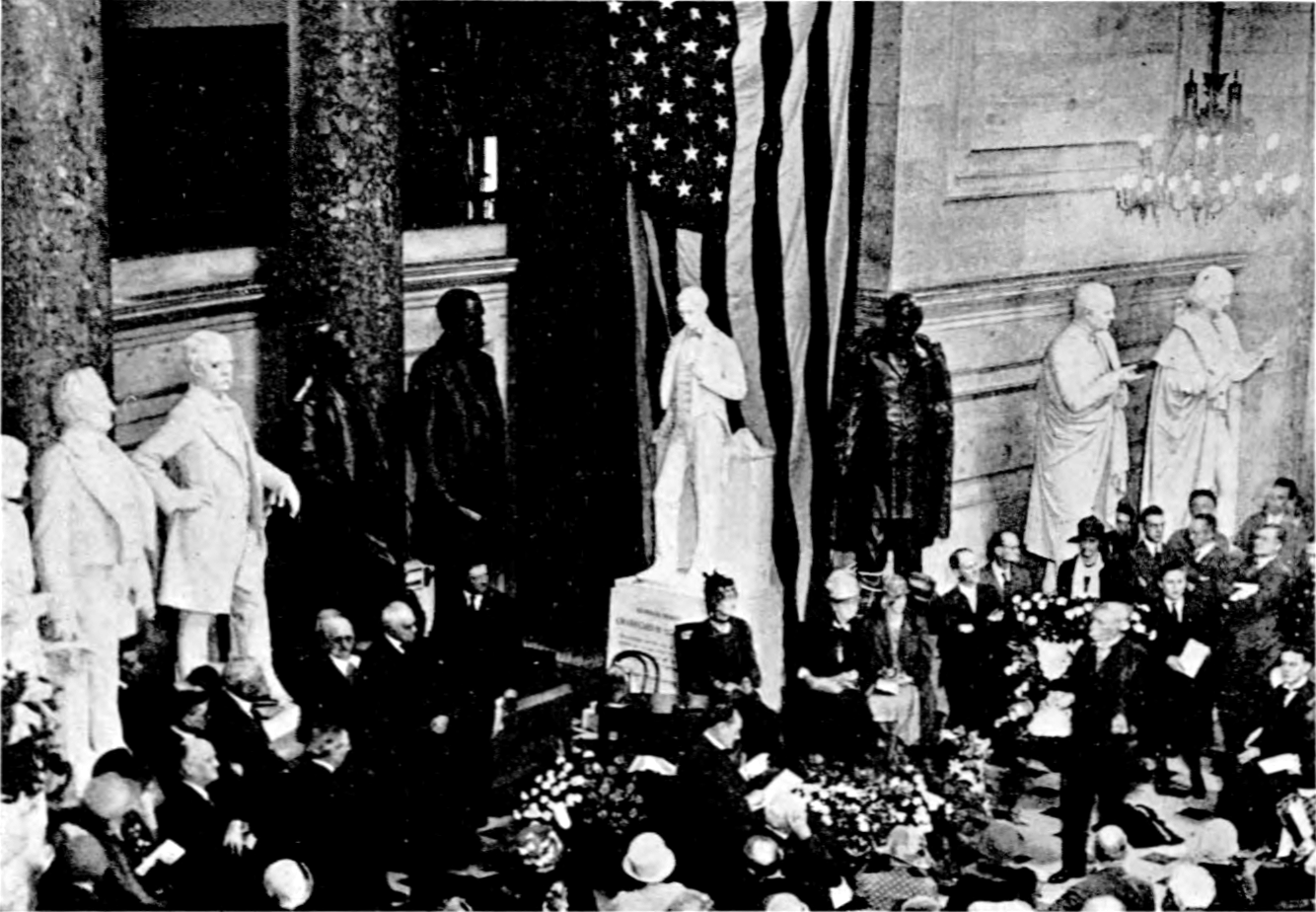
The statue's unveiling at the National Statuary Hall

== See also ==
- 1926 in art
