= Wayne County Building =

- Wayne County Courthouse
- U.S. National Register of Historic Places
- Michigan State Historic Site
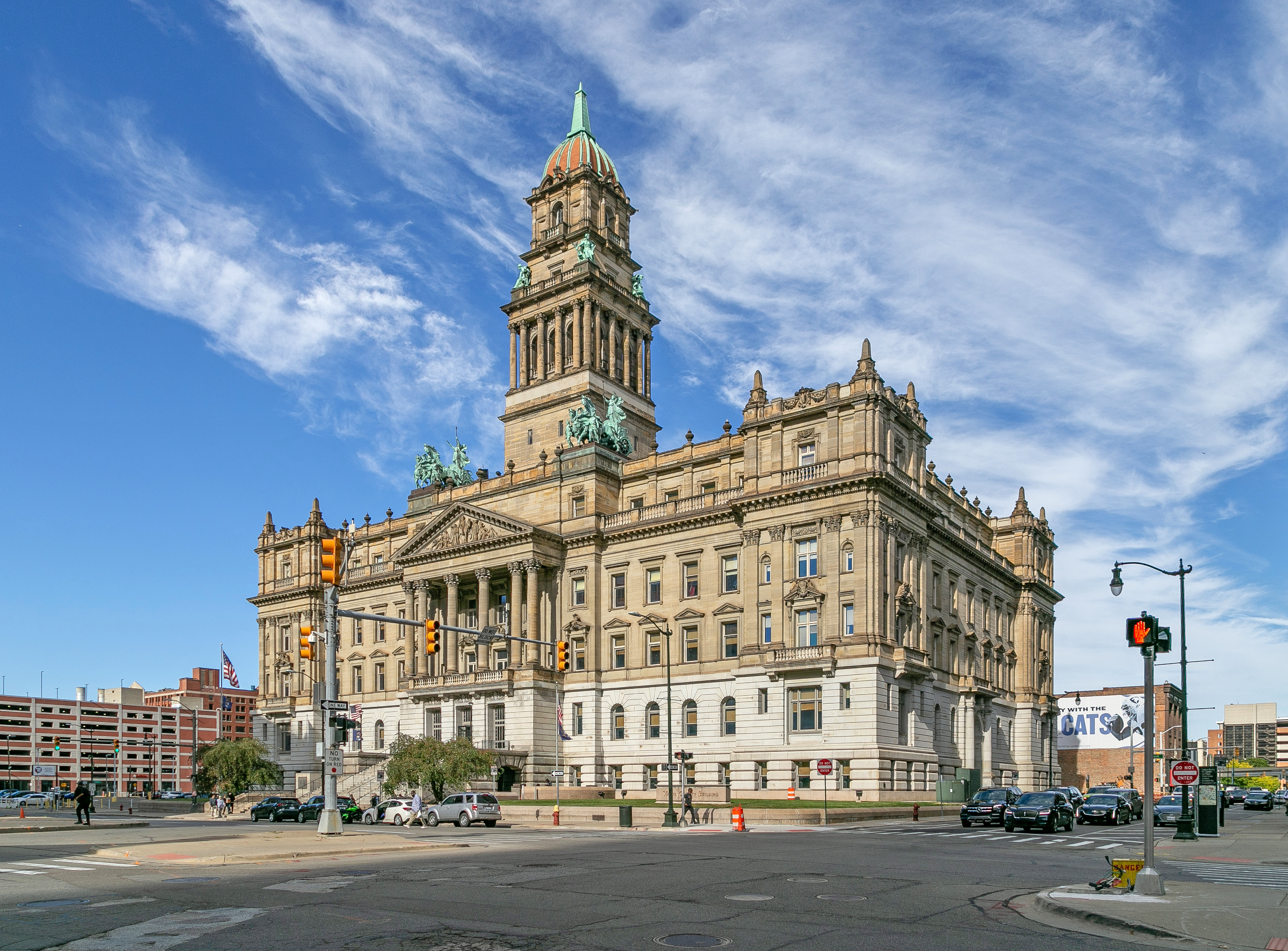
- Wayne County Building in 2022

- Location within Michigan
- Interactive map showing the location for Wayne County Courthouse
- Location: 600 Randolph Street; Detroit, Michigan
- Coordinates: 42.3321°N 83.0424°W
- Area: 2 acres (0.81 ha)
- Built: 1897–1902
- Architect: John and Arthur Scott
- Architectural style: Roman Baroque Revival, Beaux-Arts, Neoclassical, Classical Revival
- NRHP reference No.: 75000972

Significant dates
- Added to NRHP: February 24, 1975
- Designated MSHS: September 17, 1974

The Wayne County Building is a monumental government structure located at 600 Randolph Street in Downtown Detroit, Michigan. It formerly contained the Wayne County administrative offices – now located in the Guardian Building at 500 Griswold Street – and its courthouse. As Wayne County Courthouse, it was listed on the National Register of Historic Places in 1975. When it was completed in 1902, it was regarded as "one of the most sumptuous buildings in Michigan".

== Architecture ==
The building was designed by Detroit architects John and Arthur Scott. Constructed from 1897 to 1902, it may be one of the nation's finest surviving examples of Roman Baroque Revival architecture, with a blend of Beaux-Arts and some elements of the Neoclassical style.

The building stands 5 floors and was built using copper, granite, and stone. The exterior is profusely ornamented with sculpture; the interior is finished in a variety of woods, marbles, tiles, and mosaics. Built with buff Berea sandstone, the façade features a rusticated basement story and a balustrade between the third and fourth stories. At the main entrance, a broad flight of stairs leads up to a two-story Corinthian column portico. The structure boasts a tall, four-tiered, hipped roof central tower balanced by end pavilions. The courthouse tower was originally 227' 8½" tall; the copper dome and spire were redone in the 1960s, bringing its height to 247 feet.

The exterior architectural sculpture, including the Anthony Wayne pediment, was executed by Detroit sculptor Edward Wagner. The other sculptures, two quadrigas, Victory and Progress and four figures on the tower, Law, Commerce, Agriculture, and Mechanics, were sculpted by New York sculptor J. Massey Rhind, and made by Salem, Ohio resident William H. Mullins in 1903.

On the other end of Campus Martius was the old Detroit City Hall, and they adorned the landscape as 'bookends'.

A renovation was carried out in 1987 by Quinn Evans Architects and Smith, Hinchman & Grylls Associates.

== Recent news ==
On July 18, 2007, Wayne County Executive Robert Ficano announced Wayne County had entered into an agreement to purchase the Guardian Building to relocate its offices from the Wayne County Building. This purchase would commence when the county's lease on their current home expires in 2008 and end a difficult tenant-landlord relationship between the owners and the county. The Detroit Free Press print edition on July 21, 2007, carried a front-page article about the current landlord offering a reduced rate for the county to remain.

In July 2014, the Wayne County Commission approved the sale of the building along with a county-owned parking lot at 400 E. Fort Street to the New York-based investment group 600 Randolph SN LLC for $13.4 million. From March 2016 to October 2018, the building underwent a $7 million renovation that focused on exterior lighting, masonry, and window restoration.

In February 2021, the building was put up for sale for an undisclosed price.

== Gallery ==
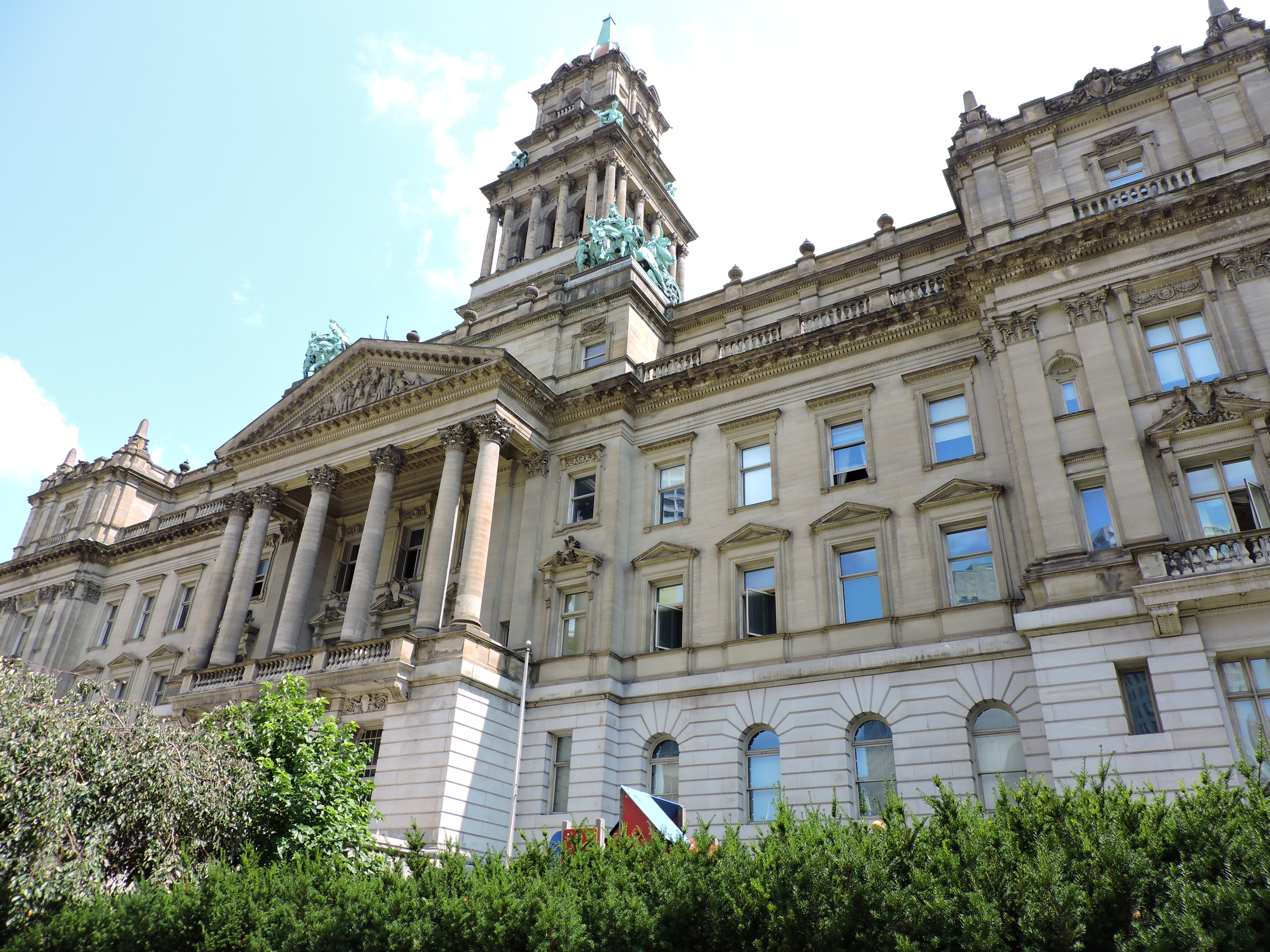
Wayne County Building in 2014

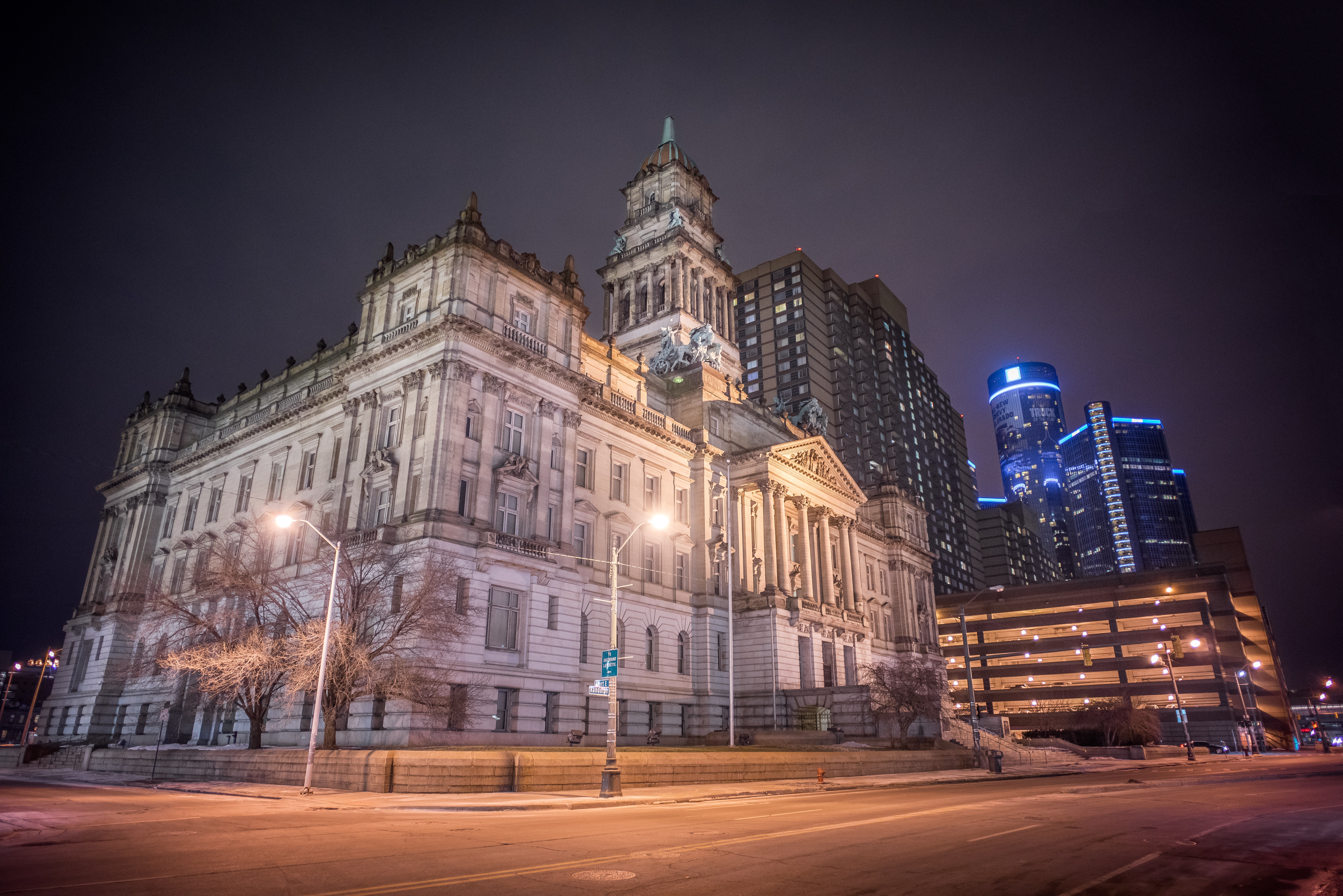
At night, 2015

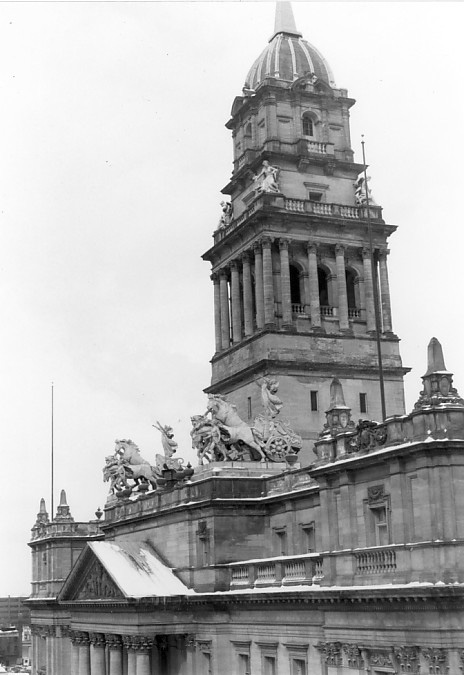
Victory and Progress
by J. Massey Rhind

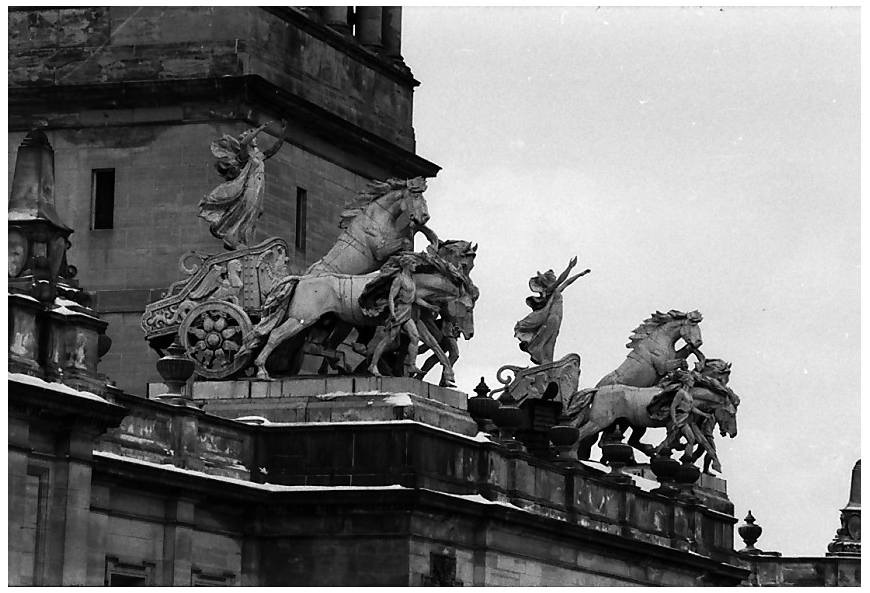
by J. Massey Rhind

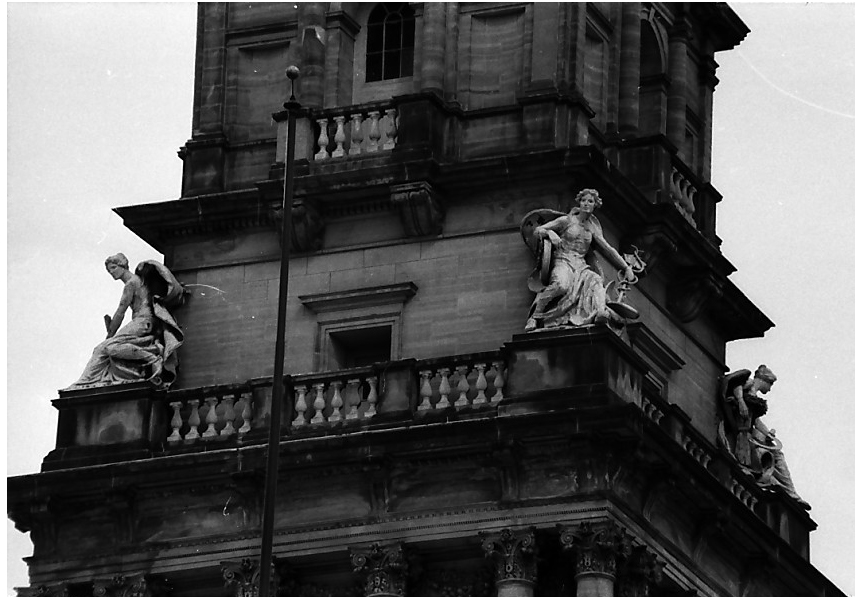
by J. Massey Rhind

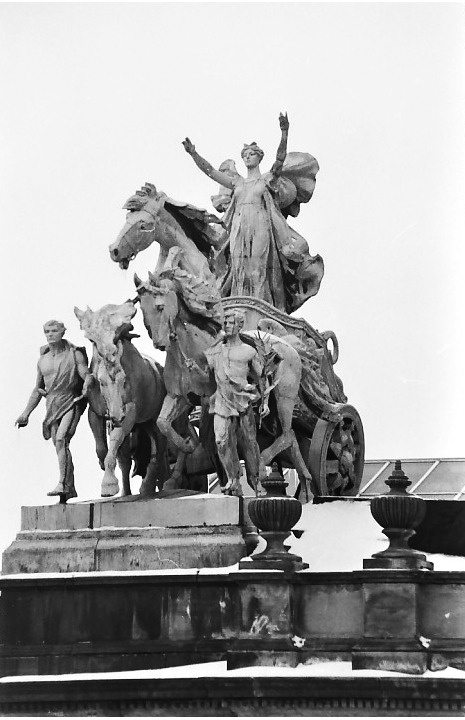
by J. Massey Rhind

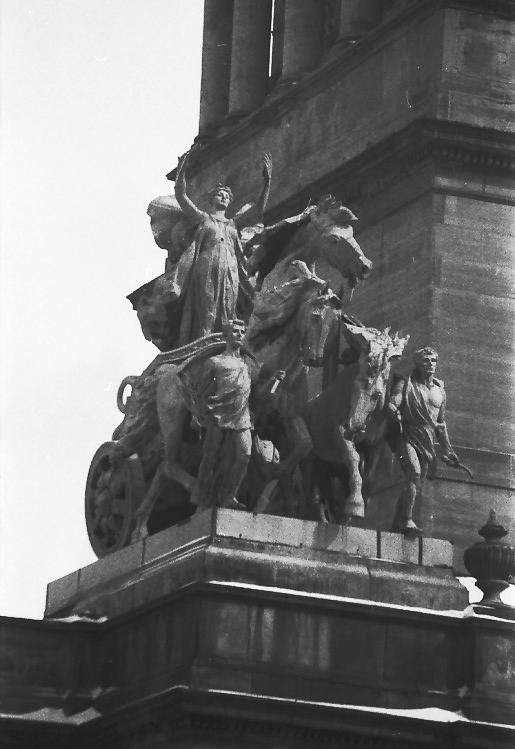
by J. Massey Rhind

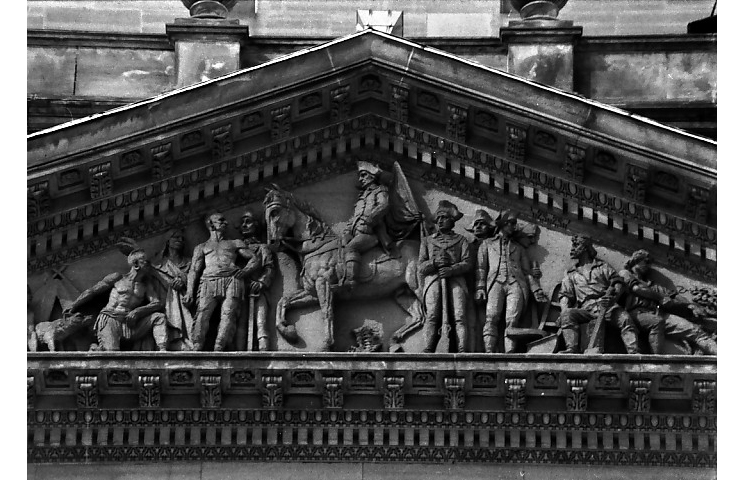
Pediment
by Edward Wagner

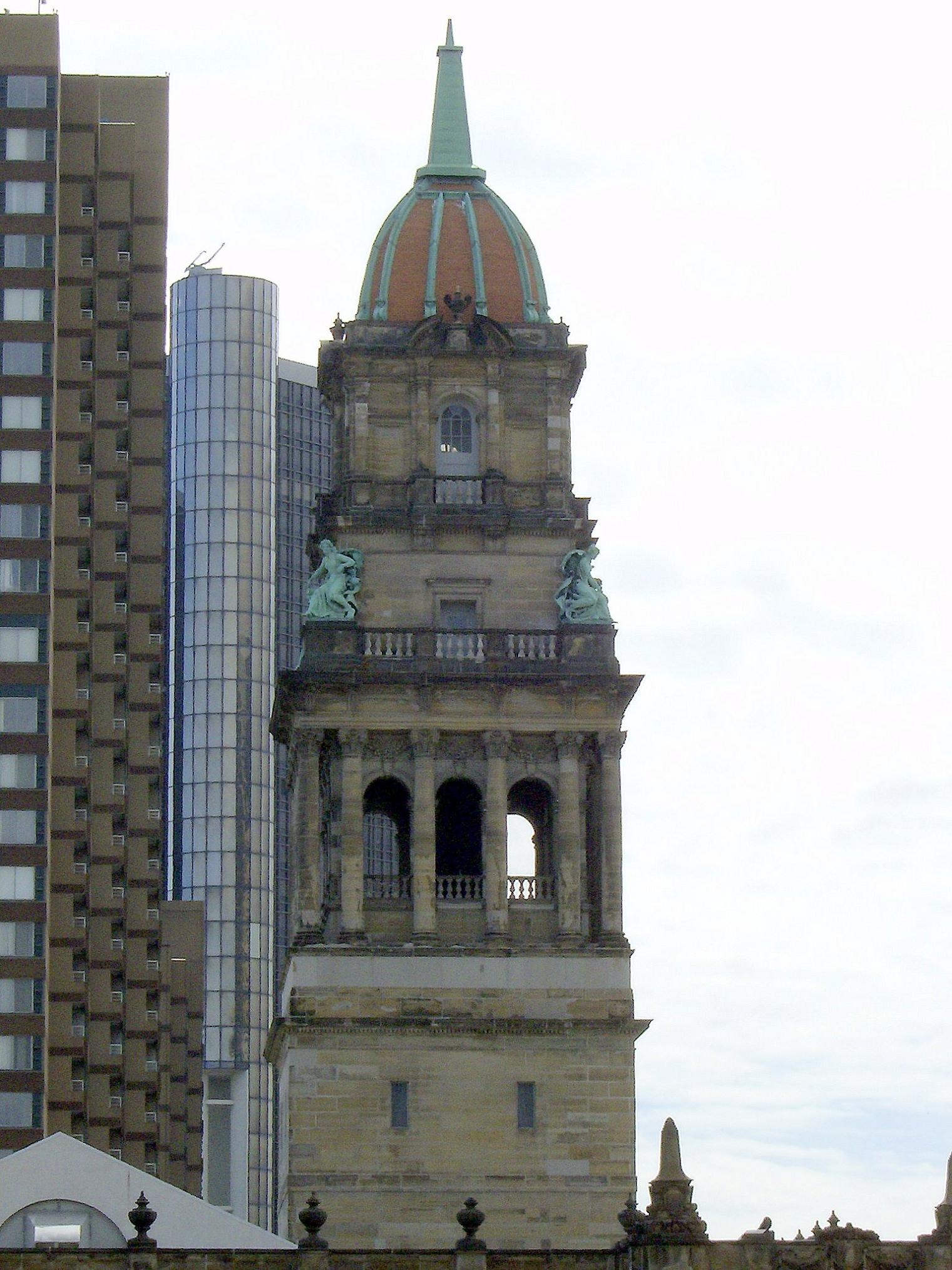
Spire

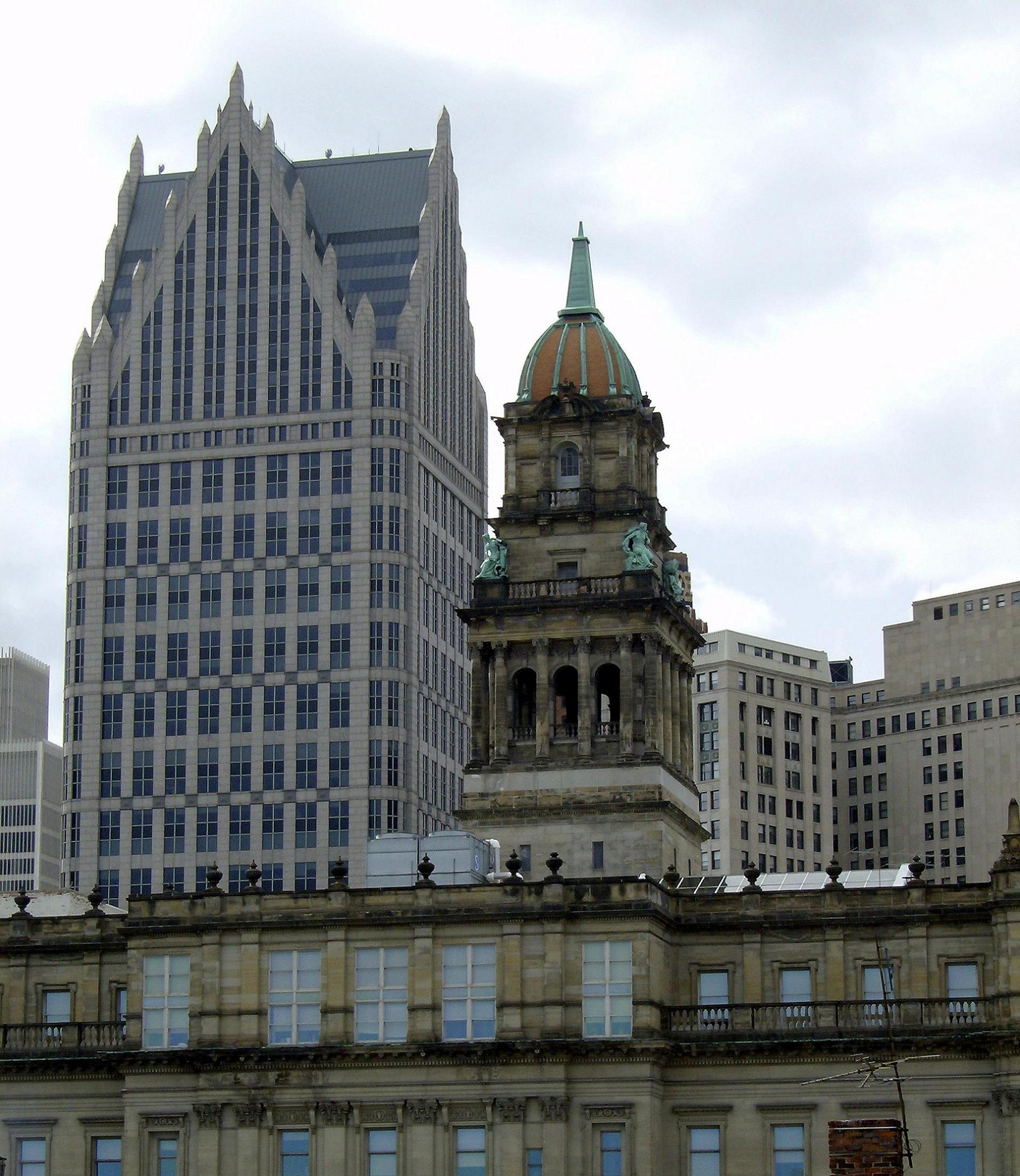
One Detroit Center has similar architectural accents

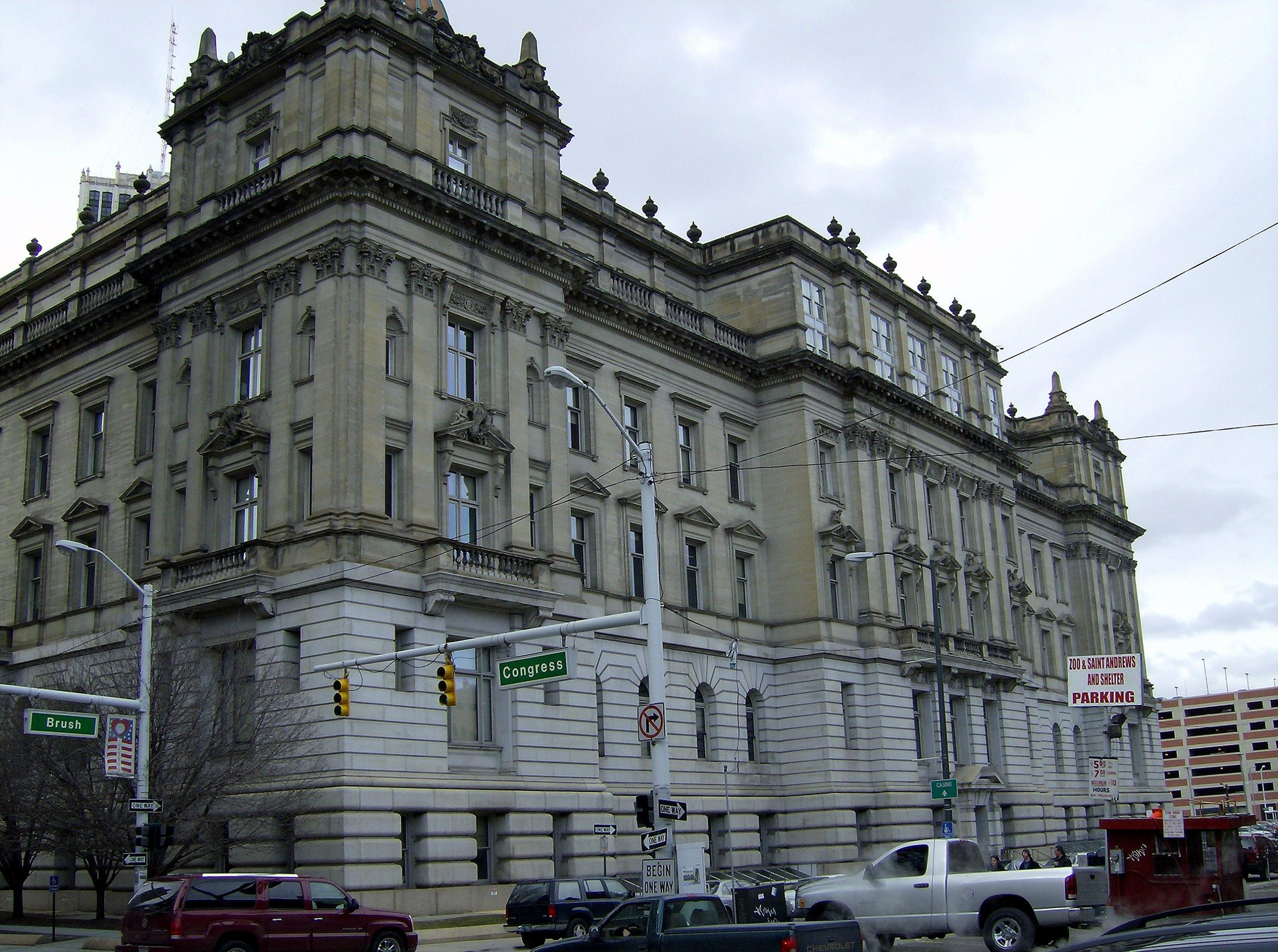
From Brush and Congress streets

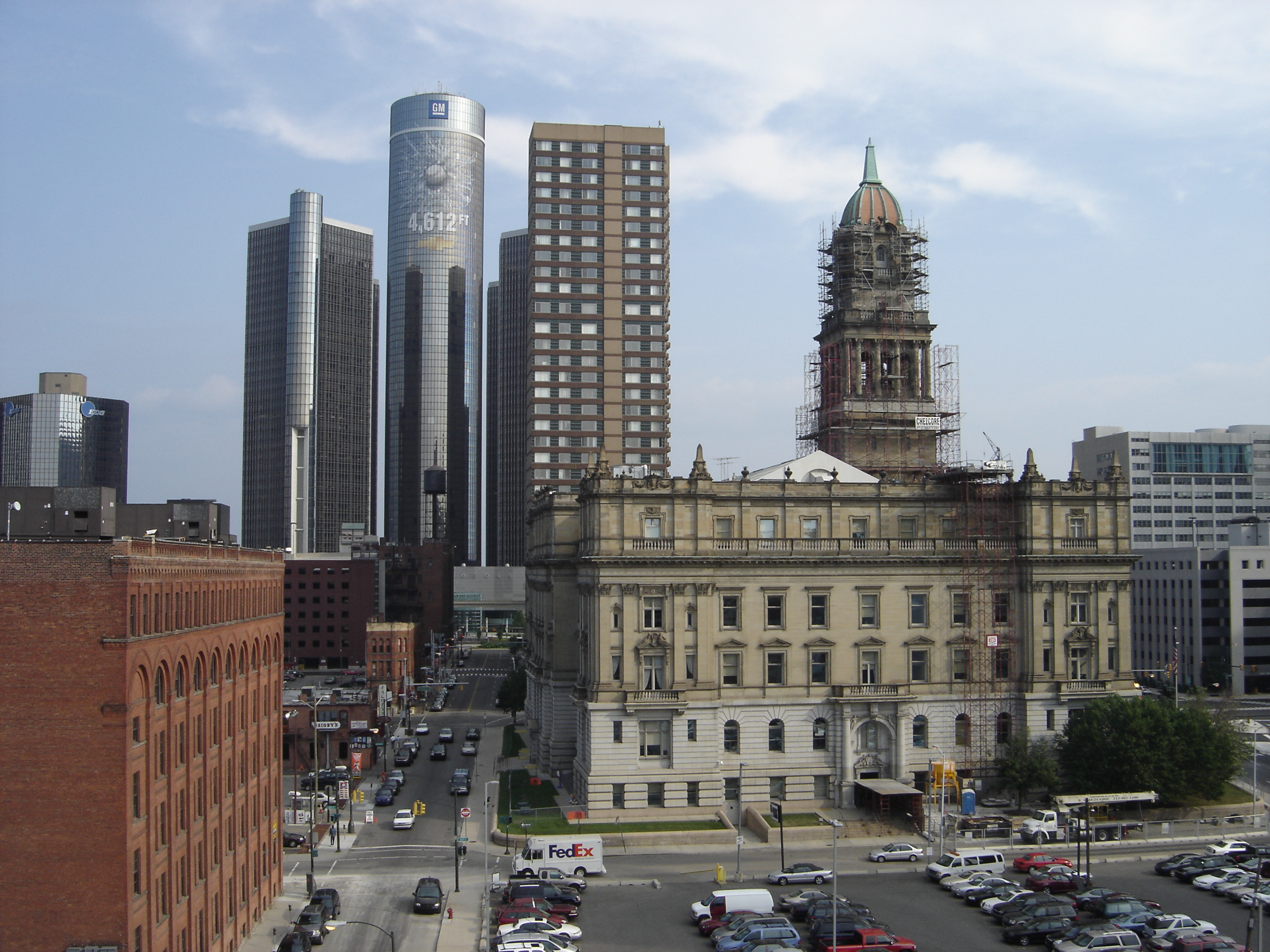
Renaissance Center with the Wayne County Building

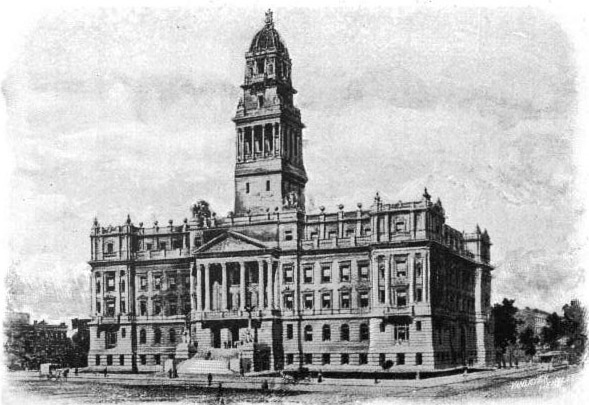
Wayne County Building in 1899

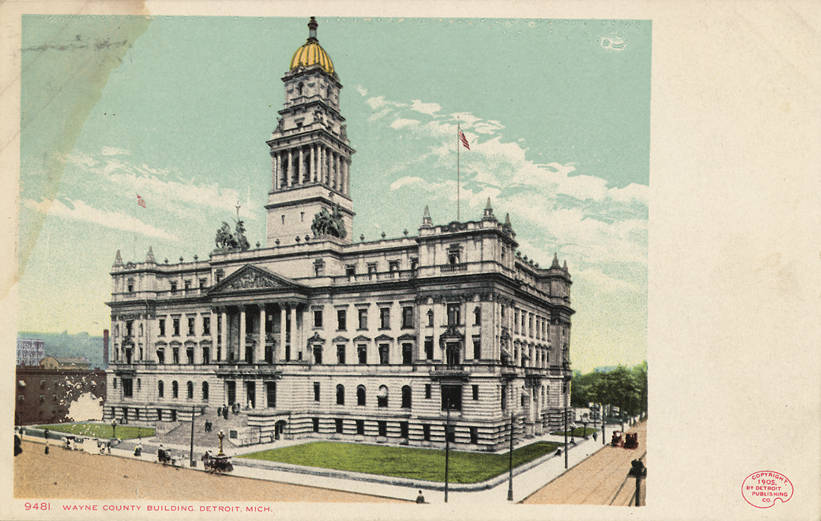
Wayne County Building, circa 1900s
