= Crawford Long =

American physician (1815–1878)

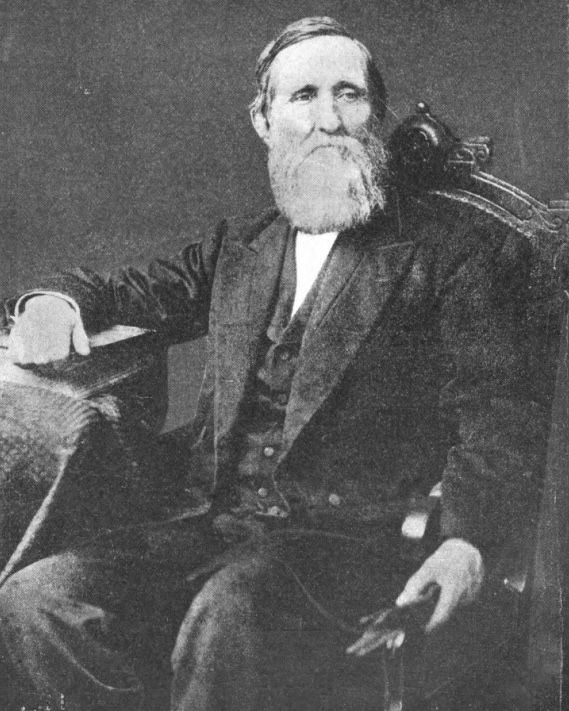
- Long in 1877
- Born: Crawford Williamson Long; November 1, 1815; Danielsville, Georgia
- Died: June 16, 1878 (aged 62); Athens, Georgia
- Education: University of Georgia; University of Pennsylvania
- Known for: Anesthesia induced by ether
- Scientific career
- Fields: Medicine

Crawford Williamson Long (November 1, 1815 – June 16, 1878) was an American surgeon and pharmacist best known for his first use of inhaled sulfuric ether as an anesthetic.

== Life and work ==
Long was born in Danielsville, Madison County, Georgia on November 1, 1815, to James and Elizabeth Long. His father was a state senator, a merchant and a planter, and named his son after his close friend and colleague, Georgia statesman William H. Crawford.

By the age of fourteen, he had graduated from the local academy and applied to the University of Georgia in Athens. It was here he met and shared a room with Alexander Stephens, future Vice President of the Confederate States of America during the American Civil War. In 1835, he received his A.M. degree. He began his study at Transylvania College in the fall of 1836 in Lexington, Kentucky. Here, Long was able to study under Benjamin Dudley, a revered surgeon. He observed and participated in many surgeries and noted the effects of operating without anesthesia. Long transferred to the University of Pennsylvania in Philadelphia after spending only a year at Transylvania College, and was exposed to some of the most advanced medical technology of the time. He received his M.D. degree at the University of Pennsylvania in 1839.

After an 18-month internship in New York, Long returned to Georgia. He took over a rural medical practice in Jefferson, Jackson County, in 1841.

Long experimented with the use of ether on three enslaved people, and observed that it had the same physiological effects that Humphry Davy had described for nitrous oxide in 1800.

Long used ether on March 30, 1842, to remove a tumor from the neck of a patient, James M. Venable. He administered sulfuric ether on a towel and simply had the patient inhale.

He performed many other surgeries using this technique during the next few years, introducing the technique to his obstetrics practice as well. Long subsequently removed a second tumor from Venable and used ether as an anesthetic in amputations and childbirth.

Despite his continued use of the ether anesthetic, Long did not immediately publish his findings. The results of these trials were eventually published in 1849 in The Southern Medical and Surgical Journal. An original copy of this publication is held in the U.S. National Library of Medicine.

Crawford Long was a member of the Demosthenian Literary Society while a student at the University of Georgia. Long was also a cousin of the western legend Doc Holliday, and may have operated on Doc's cleft lip.

On October 16, 1846, unaware of Long's prior work with ether during surgery, William T. G. Morton administered ether anesthesia before a medical audience at the Massachusetts General Hospital in Boston, Massachusetts. His work was published in the December 1846 issue of Medical Examiner which alerted Long to this other claim. Furthermore, the January 1847 issue of the editorial featured more evidence and etherization experiments. Although Long had informed several surgical colleagues who had similarly administered ether in their practices, and performed six additional surgeries since his initial discovery, Morton is generally credited with the first public demonstration of ether anesthesia. After these articles surfaced, Long began documenting the details of his experiments, collecting patient accounts, and notarizing their letters. He reported his own findings to the Medical College of Georgia in 1849. While he was in Augusta, he learned of two additional physicians staking an ether claim – Charles Jackson and Horace Wells. It was at this time that his findings were finally published. He addressed the controversy in his first publication:

A controversy soon ensued between Messrs. Jackson, Morton and Wells, in regard to who was entitled to the honor of being the discoverer of the anaesthetic powers of ether, and a considerable time elapsed before I was able to ascertain the exact period when their first operations were performed. Ascertaining this fact, through negligence I have now permitted a much longer time to elapse than I designed, or than my professional friends with whom I consulted advised; but as no account has been published, (so far as I have been able to ascertain), of the inhalation of ether being used to prevent pain in surgical operations as early as March 1842. My friends think I would be doing myself injustice, not to notify my brethren of the medical profession of my priority of the use of ether by inhalation in surgical practice.

In 1854, Long requested William Crosby Dawson, a U.S. Senator, to present his claims of ether anesthesia discovery to the attention of Congress. Despite his extensive petitioning and documented proof, he never received full credit for his discovery during his lifetime.

Long married Caroline Swain in 1842 and together they had twelve children, seven of whom survived to adulthood. The family moved to Atlanta in 1850, then again to Athens in 1851 to be closer to friends and family. Here, Long and his brother Robert opened a private practice and pharmacy on Broad Street, just across from campus. During the Civil War, he joined a militia unit in Athens, but was never called to duty. Instead he served there as a surgeon to soldiers on both sides. He died of a stroke on June 16, 1878, shortly after helping to deliver a baby. He is buried alongside his wife in Oconee Hill Cemetery in Athens, Georgia. Throughout his professional career, Long was strongly convinced of his calling to serve humanity. He said that his profession was a "ministry from God" and that "his highest ambition was to do good and leave the world better by his labors."

== Legacy ==
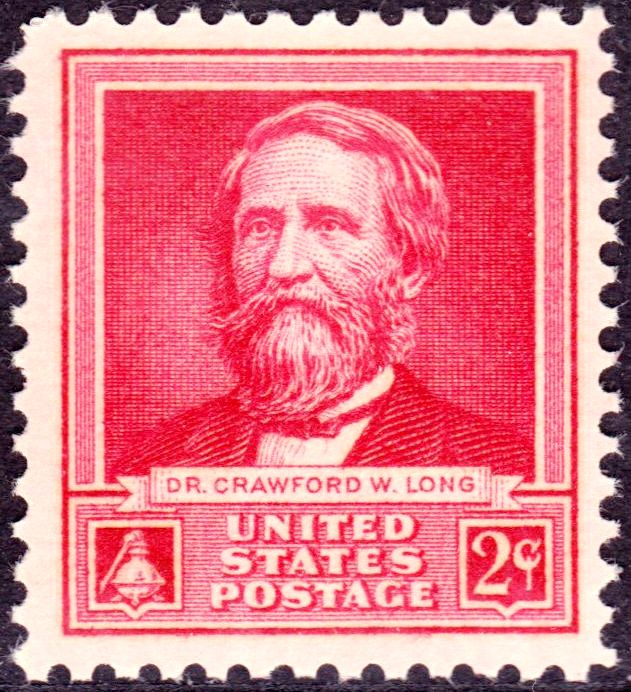
Crawford Long U.S. postage stamp

Long was the first obstetric anesthetist. In 1845, he had his wife inhale while she was giving birth. Until recently, his practice of using inhalation anesthesia dominated obstetrics. In 1849, Long announced his discovery in a small local magazine. However, he did not receive significant recognition until Marion Sims, a New York surgeon, published the first major article about Long's contribution. Today, the majority of scholars concur that Long performed the first successful surgery using anesthesia. In fact, Long administered ether to 7 patients, none of whom felt any pain during their operations, several years prior to Morton's 1846 public exposition. One of Long's letters is very revealing as to the origins of Morton's ideas. He wrote,

Permit me to say then, that a Dentist and a surgeon from Boston, Mass. were in Jefferson Jackson County in 1842, 3 or 4 and remained for several weeks. The dentist practiced his profession & the surgeon operated for strabismus-I have always thought it probable, that the Dentist was Morton or Wells, & that a knowledge of my use of ether in surgical operations was obtained at that time. I have not been able to ascertain the name of the dentist, if you know the history of Dr. Wells, you can possibly asertain (sic) whether he travelled South at the time mentioned."

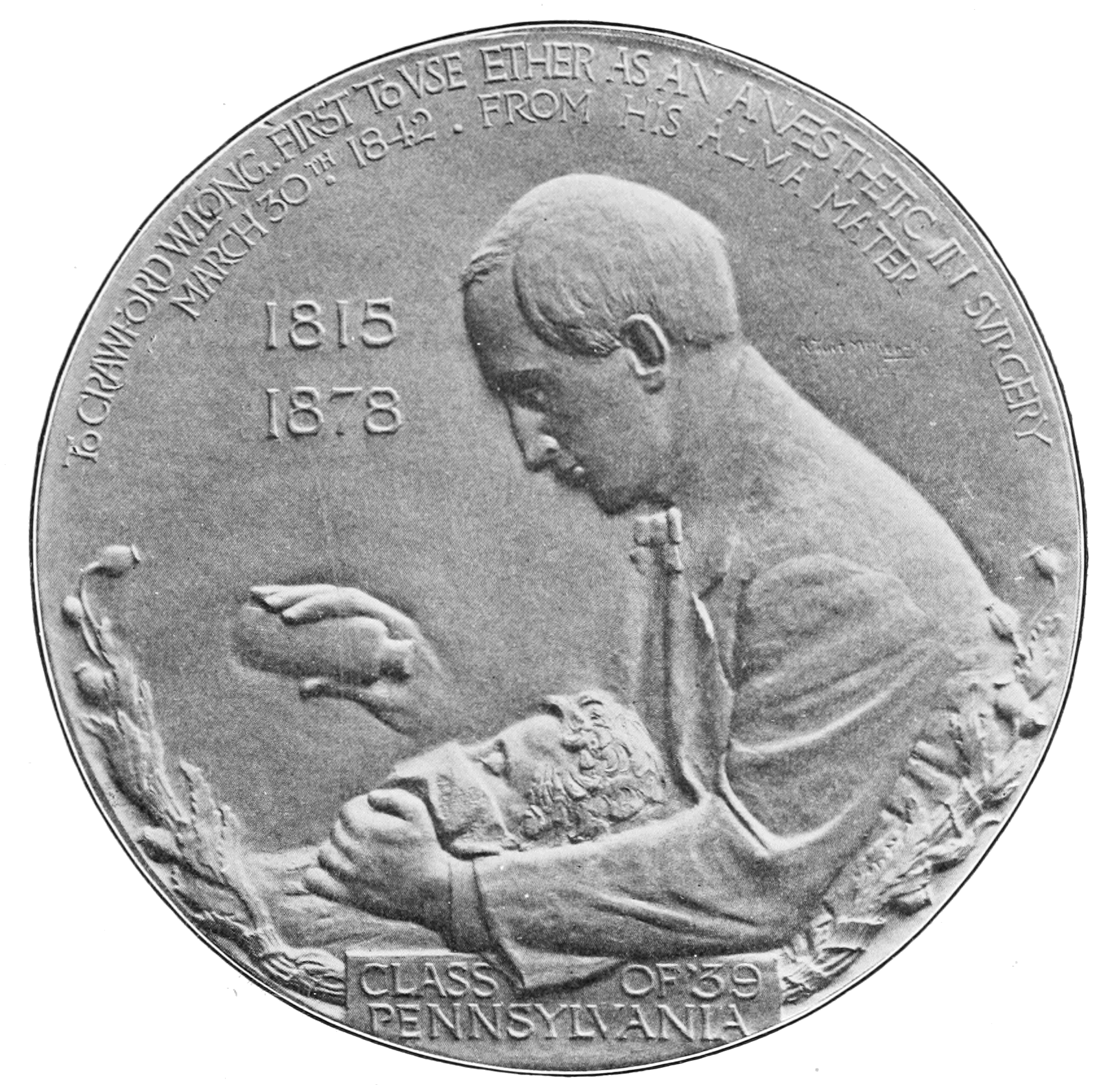
A bronze medallion issued by the University of Pennsylvania in memory of Dr. Crawford Long, depicting him pouring sulfuric ether on to a piece of cloth over a patient's nose and mouth. The inscription of the medallion reads: "To Crawford W. Long. First to vse ether as an anæsthetic in svrgery March 30th 1842. From his alma mater. Class of '39 Pennsylvania".

Reportedly, Long failed to publish his findings until 1849 for two reasons. Firstly, he wished to confirm the results of his experiments several times before propagating his ideas. Secondly, he wished to wait to see if another medical practitioner came forward to counter Morton's claims to discovery, a physician who potentially discovered anesthesia prior to himself. After reading about Morton's demonstration in the Medical Examiner, Long began asking his patients to submit affidavits corroborating his discovery. Long almost certainly discovered the anesthetic powers of ether before Morton demonstrated its ability to dull pain during surgery to the general public, but several other men sought credit for their supposed joint contribution to surgery. The men included Morton, Horace Wells of Hartford, Connecticut, and Charles J. Jackson. Throughout what became known as the "ether controversy", the men vied for a reward of $200,000 from the US Congress. Initially, it appears as though many were reluctant to give Long any credit. William Welch reportedly said,

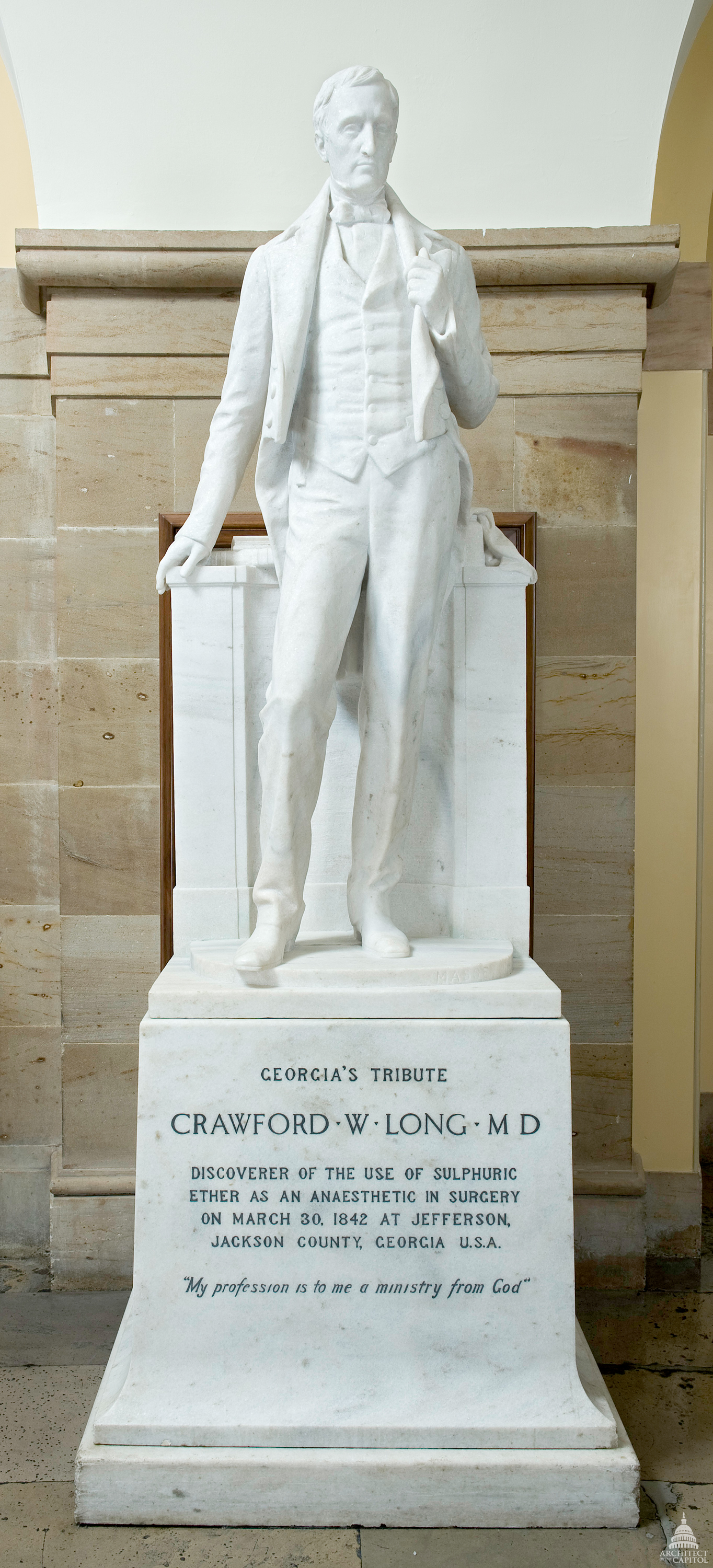
Statue of Long, National Statuary Hall Collection

We cannot assign to him any influence upon the historical development of our knowledge of surgical anesthesia or any share in its introduction to the world at large."

In 1879, a year after Long's death, the National Eclectic Medical Association declared that he was the official discoverer of anesthesia. At Long's funeral, Chancellor Andrew Lipscomb said:

Standing here in the presence of his remains, I am this day but the voice of the church, of his professional brethren, and of this whole community when I say in Dr. Long's death we have lost an excellent man. He assumed nothing, and was thoroughly truthful in looks, tone, manner and action; lived simply, treated everyone courteously, and walked humbly before God. Modest even to the verge of timidity, he could be stern and bold, and utterly forgetful of self, if responsibility had to be met, or danger confronted. Gentle, forbearing, faithful to every wise instinct, he kept the covenant of a heart's true love until his days were numbered. He had strength of will and power of endurance. The minor heroisms which make up so large a share of a physician's experience, and of which the world knows so little, wrote many a paragraph in the annals of his life. We shall give the manly virtues of Christian integrity of Crawford Long a dwelling place where so many of the elect of our life already gathered."

In 1879, the National Eclectic Medical Association declared that Long was the official discoverer of anesthesia. "Doctors Day" is celebrated on March 30 every year to commemorate Long's contributions.

The University of Pennsylvania memorialized Crawford W. Long in Philadelphia, Pennsylvania, April 1912, with a bulletin and bronze medallion.

On August 14, 1920, the Georgia state legislature proposed a constitutional amendment to create a new county from the western portions of Liberty County, to be named after Long. The amendment creating Long County was ratified on November 2, 1920. The county seat is Ludowici.

The Emory-University-operated Crawford W. Long Hospital in downtown Atlanta, Georgia was named in his honor in 1931 and retained that name for 78 years. In 2009 the hospital was renamed "Emory University Hospital Midtown". References to Crawford W. Long Memorial Hospital are retained on exterior monuments.

Long was honored in the "Famous American Series" of postage stamps in 1940, and in 1978 with a postcard.

The Crawford W. Long Museum in downtown Jefferson, Georgia, has been in operation since 1957. A monument in honor of Long was unveiled in Jefferson on April 21, 1910.

A statue of Long stands in the crypt of the United States Capitol as one of the two designated monuments to represent Georgia in the National Statuary Hall Collection (the other is his college roommate, Alexander Stephens). Crawford Long Middle School, in Atlanta, Georgia, was also named in his honor.

Long's childhood home was added to the National Register of Historic Places on December 6, 1977. It is on Crawford W. Long Street in Danielsville, Georgia. Its coordinates are 34°07′34″N 83°13′28″W.

== See also ==
- Charles Thomas Jackson – claimed to be the first to discover the anesthetic properties of diethyl ether
- William T. G. Morton – dentist who demonstrated the use of ether in surgery prior to the time Long's activities were generally known
- Hanaoka Seishū – first physician to use general anesthesia
- Madison County, Georgia, courthouse, site of a statue of Long
