= Cast-iron architecture =

Buildings that make extensive use of cast iron in their structures

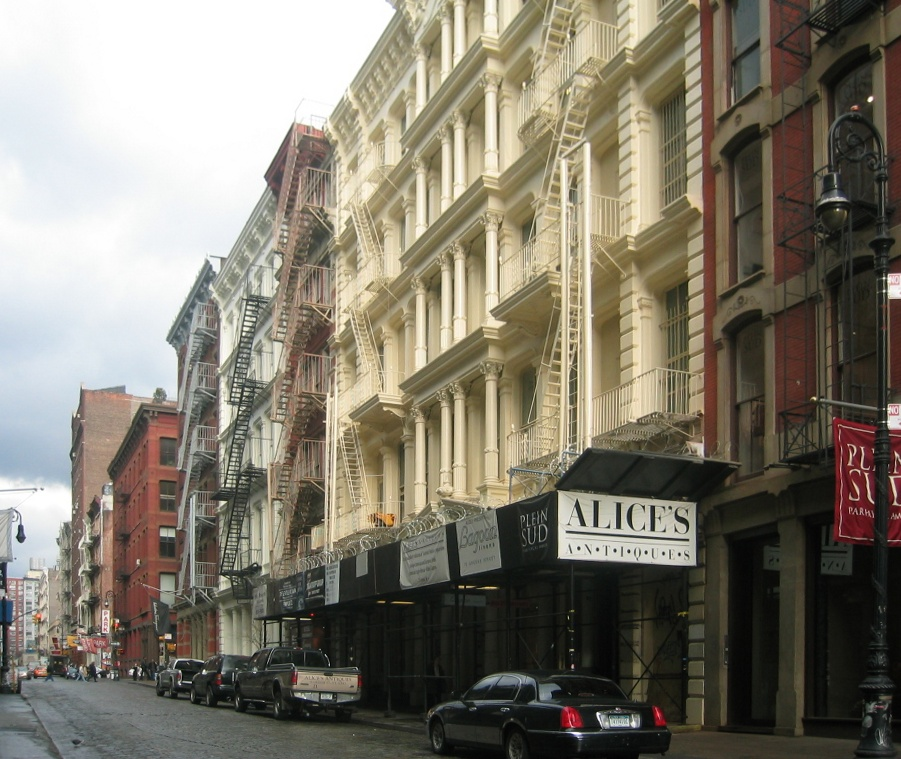
A street in SoHo in New York City famous for its numerous cast-iron facades.

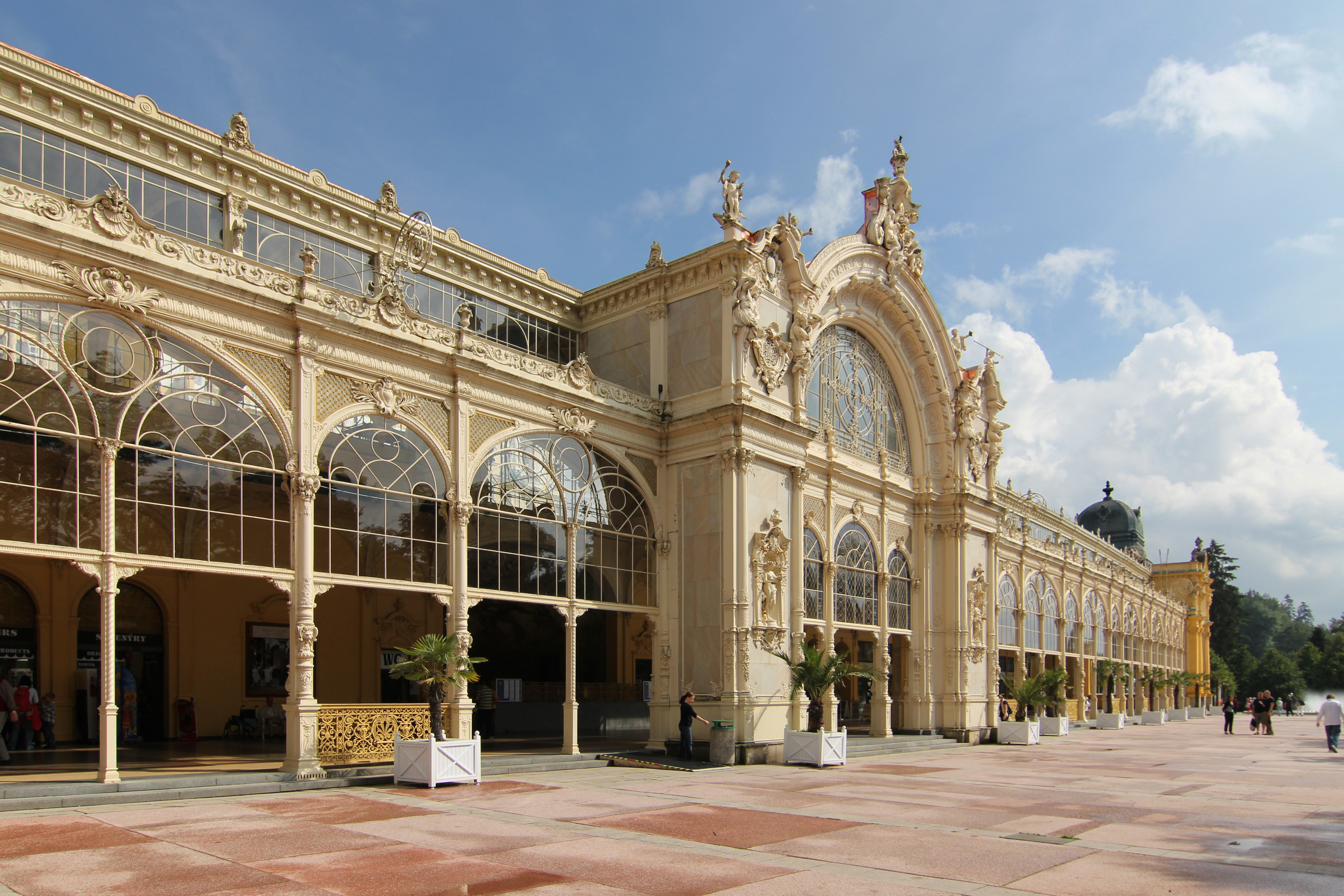
Spa Colonnade in Mariánské Lázně, 1889. Nearly every element is cast iron.

Cast-iron architecture is the use of cast iron in buildings and objects, ranging from bridges and markets to warehouses, balconies and fences. Refinements developed during the Industrial Revolution in the late 18th century made cast iron relatively cheap and suitable for a range of uses, and by the mid-19th century it was common as a structural material (and sometimes for entire buildings), and particularly for elaborately patterned architectural elements such as fences and balconies, until it fell out of fashion after 1900 as a decorative material, and was replaced by modern steel and concrete for structural purposes.

== Structural use ==
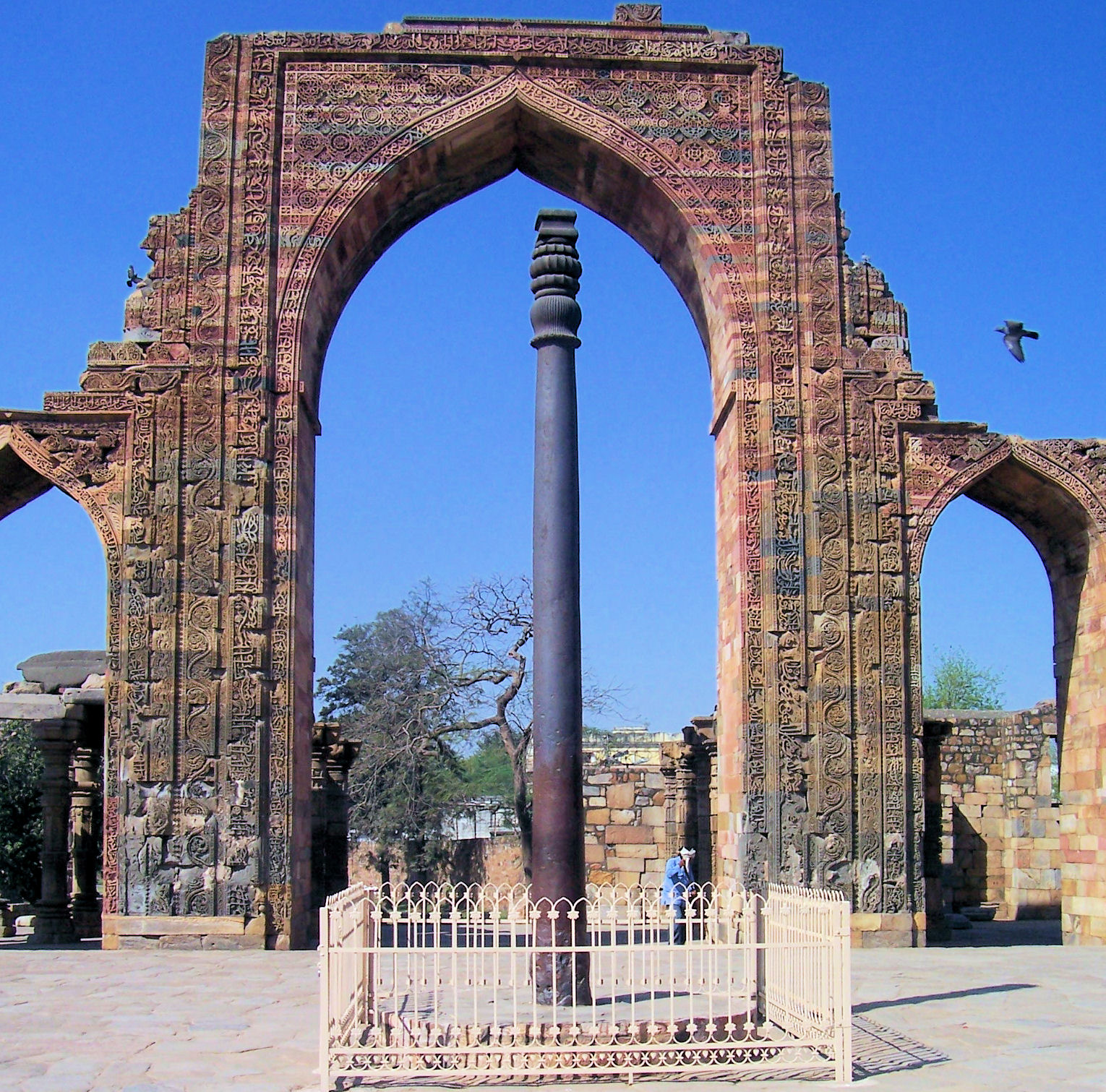
Iron Pillar of Delhi, in India, built in 5th century AD, similar to cast iron but believed to be wrought iron.

Cast iron is not a good structural material for handling tension or bending moments because of its brittleness and relatively low tensile strength compared to steel and wrought iron. However, cast iron does have good compressive strength and was successfully used for structural components that were largely in compression in well-designed bridges and buildings. In a few instances bridges and buildings built with cast iron failed when misused.

Cast iron was used as early as the 9th century in pagoda construction in Tang dynasty China. Texts written by the Japanese Buddhist monk Ennin describe in detail the cast-iron pagodas and statues widespread in China at the time. Persecution of Buddhism in China in the 840's led to the destruction of many of these structures. The later Song dynasty also built cast iron pagodas, exploiting its ability to be both structural and to be cast in any shape, such as in imitation of the timber and tiles of a standard pagoda. The 22m Iron Pagoda at the Yuquan Temple (Jade Springs Temple), Dangyang, Hubei, was built during the Song dynasty in 1061, and is the most outstanding example to survive. Cast iron pagodas were then superseded by even more elaborate bronze ones, but cast iron continued to be used for decorative items such as bowls and statues.

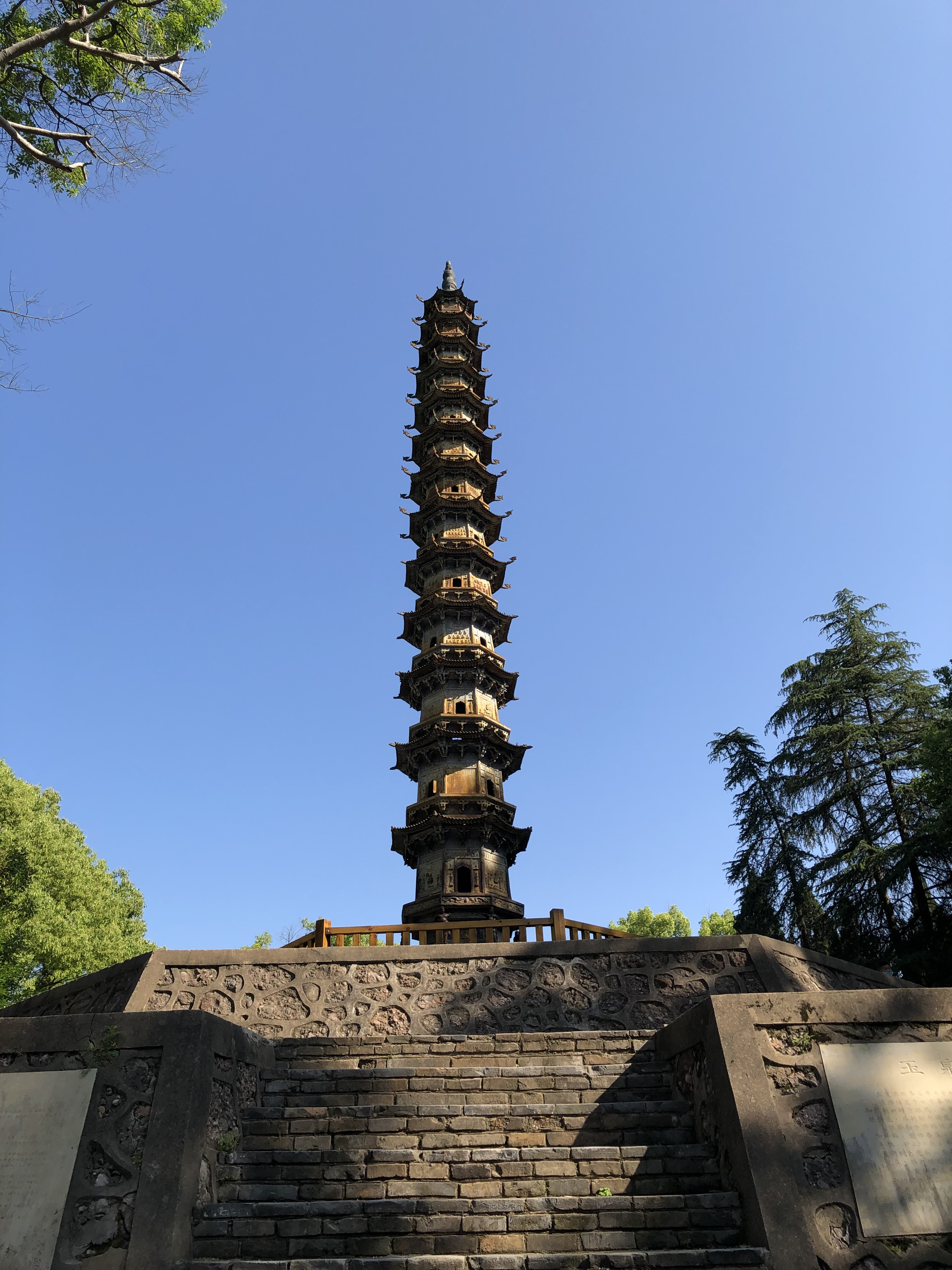
Iron Pagoda of Yuquan Temple, in Dangyang, China, built in Renzong reign of the Northern Song Dynasty (1061 AD)

In Europe, it was in late 18th-century Britain that new production methods first allowed cast iron to be produced cheaply enough and in large enough quantities to regularly be used in large building projects. New production methods included using steam engine powered blast air, which allowed higher blast furnace temperatures, which in turn allowed the use of more limestone to be added with the iron ore charge. The higher furnace temperatures made the slag produced with the additional lime to flow more freely. The calcium and magnesium in the lime helped tie up sulfur, which allowed the use of coke for fuel. The higher furnace temperatures also increased the furnace capacity.

=== Bridges ===
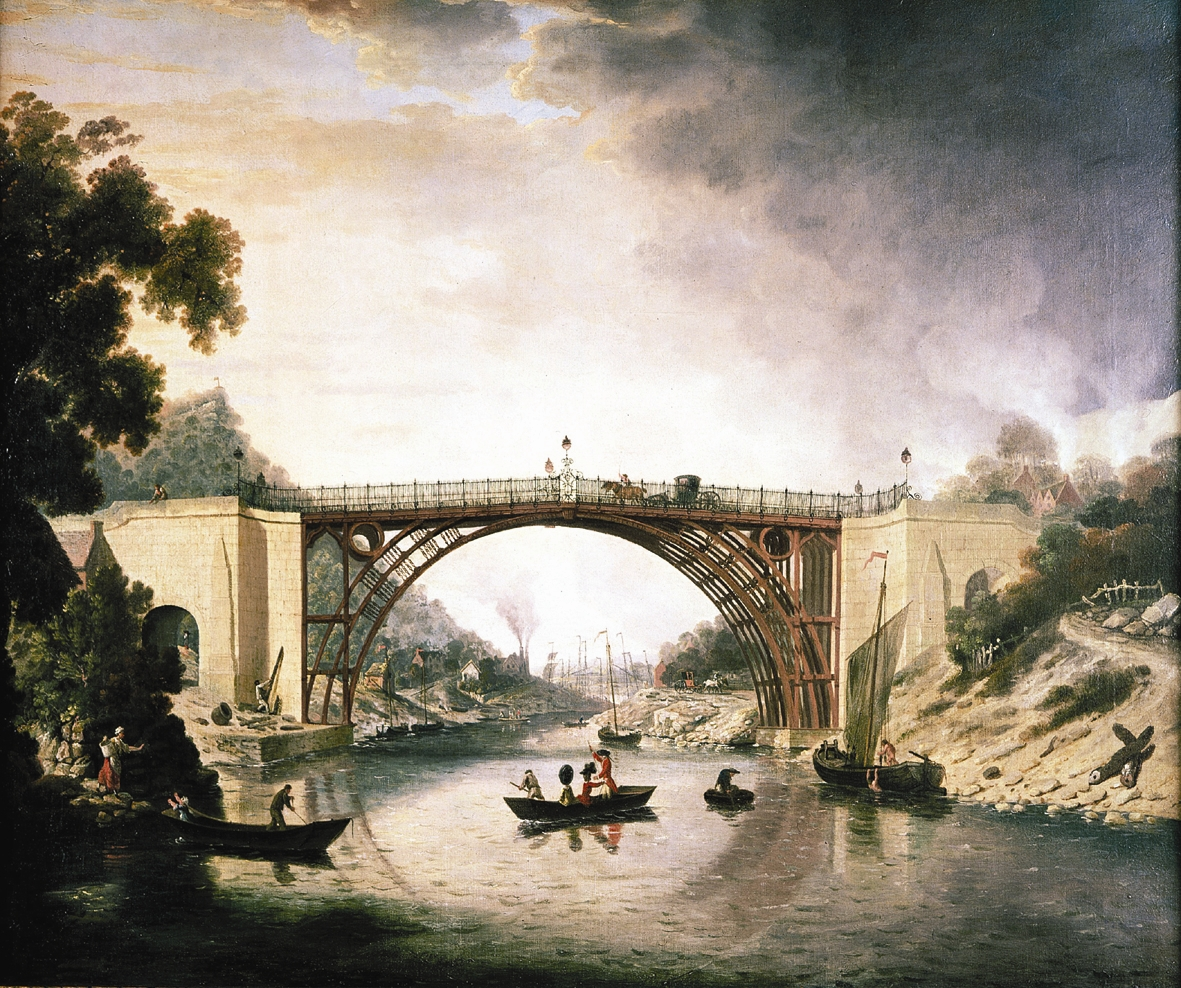
The Iron Bridge, Coalbrookdale, Shropshire, 1781. The first large scale use of cast iron for structural purposes.

One of the first important projects was The Iron Bridge in Shropshire, opened in 1781, a precedent-setting structure made almost entirely of cast iron. However, it was grossly over-designed, and the makers (principally Abraham Darby) suffered financially as a result. The quality of the iron used in the bridge is not high, and nearly 80 brittle cracks are visible in the present structure. Nevertheless, its success led to the use of cast iron for further bridges and structures by the Coalbrookdale foundries and others.

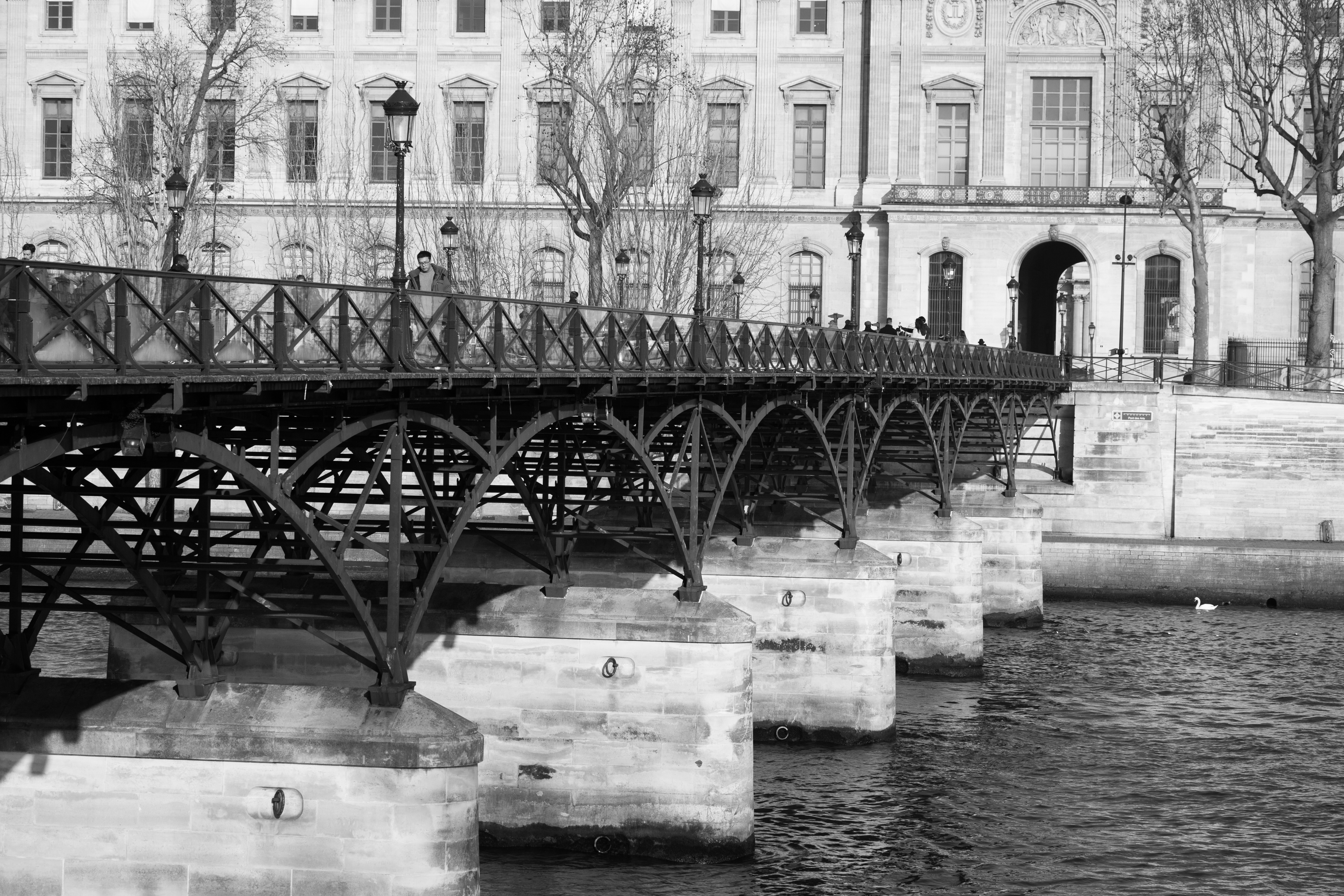
Pont Des Arts, Paris, built in 1804

Engineer Thomas Telford improved both the design and quality of the material in bridges, for example, at Buildwas in 1796, upstream of Coalbrookdale, and also for aqueducts, such as the world-famous Pontcysyllte Aqueduct in North Wales, built in 1805, where both the arches and the trough are constructed of cast iron. On the continent, the 1804 Pont des Arts in Paris is an early and elegant use of cast iron for a major city river crossing (the metal work of the current bridge is a near identical copy built in 1984 due to structural decay).

Another notable example is the elegant Ha'penny Bridge in Dublin, cast by the Coalbrookdale foundry, and built in 1816. The superior performance and greater spans of wrought-iron, and later wire suspension bridges, soon superseded cast iron for bridge construction.

=== Early use in buildings ===
Cast-iron columns for buildings had the advantage of being extremely slender, compared with masonry columns capable of supporting similar weight. That saved space in factories, and so after the five-storey 1795 Ditherington Flax Mill with its internal structure of cast-iron proved the concept, it became ubiquitous in the multi-level mills of northern England, and then across Europe and the United States, helping to fuel the Industrial Revolution. Its usefulness for multi storey buildings ensured it remained popular for all kinds of industrial and commercial structures, as well as supports for balconies in theatres and even in churches, up until it was finally replaced by steel in about 1900.

Cast iron was also taken up by some architects in the early 19th century where smaller supports or larger spans were required (and where wrought iron was too expensive), notably in the Royal Pavilion in Brighton, designed by John Nash and built between 1816 and 1823, where cast iron columns were used within the walls, as well as cast iron beams, to enable the construction of the decorative domes; the columns in the kitchens were disguised as palm trees.

=== Roof frames ===
An elaborate cast iron frame was used for the dome of Saint Isaac's Cathedral in St Petersburg (1837–38), and the new roof following a fire of Chartes Cathedral (also 1837–8, and the widest span of a metal roof at the time). Similarly large span beams were also to support the wide roofs of the Palace of Westminster (1840s–50s).

=== Piers ===
Cast iron was also used as the principle support structure for seaside piers, with multiple slender columns able to support long decks of wrought iron and wood, and later large halls and pavilions; engineer Eugenius Birch built the first, Margate Pier in 1855, followed by at least 14 piers in Britain in the 1860s–80s, and many more in Europe.

=== Use with wrought iron ===
Cast iron was not useful for items in tension like beams, where the more expensive wrought iron was preferred. Improvements in production saw the costs decrease at the same time as cast iron gained popularity. The puddling process, patented in 1784, was a relatively low cost method for producing a structural grade wrought iron. Puddled wrought iron was a much better structural material, and was preferred for bridges, rails, ships and building beams, and was often used in combination with cast iron, which was better in compression.

=== Steel ===
Steel was an even better structural material than wrought iron, and new steel making processes developed in the late 19th century greatly lowered the cost of production to far below the cost of wrought iron. The widespread use of cast-and-wrought iron frames in multi-level buildings was translated into steel-frame buildings, and was an essential step in the development of the modern skyscraper.

== Architectural use ==
In Europe, cast iron had been occasionally used with architectural embellishment in the Middle Ages, such as fire backs with cast figures and scenes. The improvements in techniques in the late 18th century led to the possibilities of finer castings, allowing decorative objects such as statuary and jewelry to be mass-produced. Following the development of the material as for structural purposes, it was soon adapted for uses that were both decorative and structural in all manner of buildings, structures and objects.

=== Early balustrades, railings and memorials ===
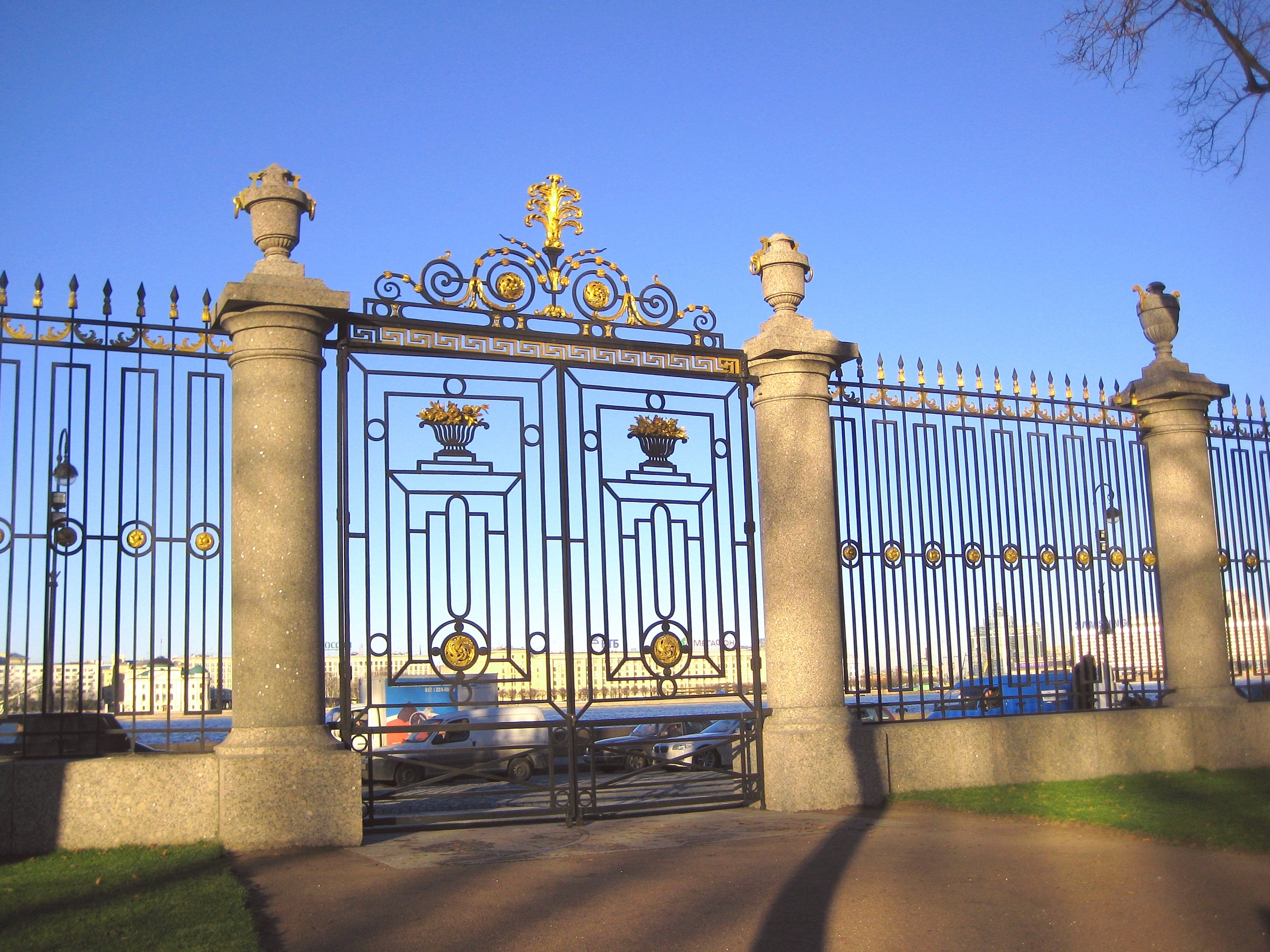
Summer Garden fence, Saint Petersburg, 1780s

As soon as improvements in techniques led to finer castings, designers exploited the decorative possibilities. As early as 1775, noted architect Robert Adam joined with the Scottish Carron Company iron works to produce balcony railings in imitation of wrought iron, such as the railing for the Adelphi in London (a pattern that was still produced into the 1830s). Another very early large scale example is the delicate fence of the Summer Garden in Saint Petersburg, designed by Georg Von Veldten, built between 1771 and 1784, which also imitated wrought iron, and is considered the pinnacle of cast iron design in the city. Other well known architects were early adopters of the material; John Nash employed cast iron as part of the structure of his landmark 1820s Royal Pavilion in Brighton, and German architect Karl Friedrich Schinkel was an enthusiastic early adopter, using cast iron for memorials such as the 20m tall Gothic Revival Kreuzberg War Memorial in 1821, and the delightful nautical seahorses and mermaids in the balustrade of the 1820s Castle Bridge in Berlin.

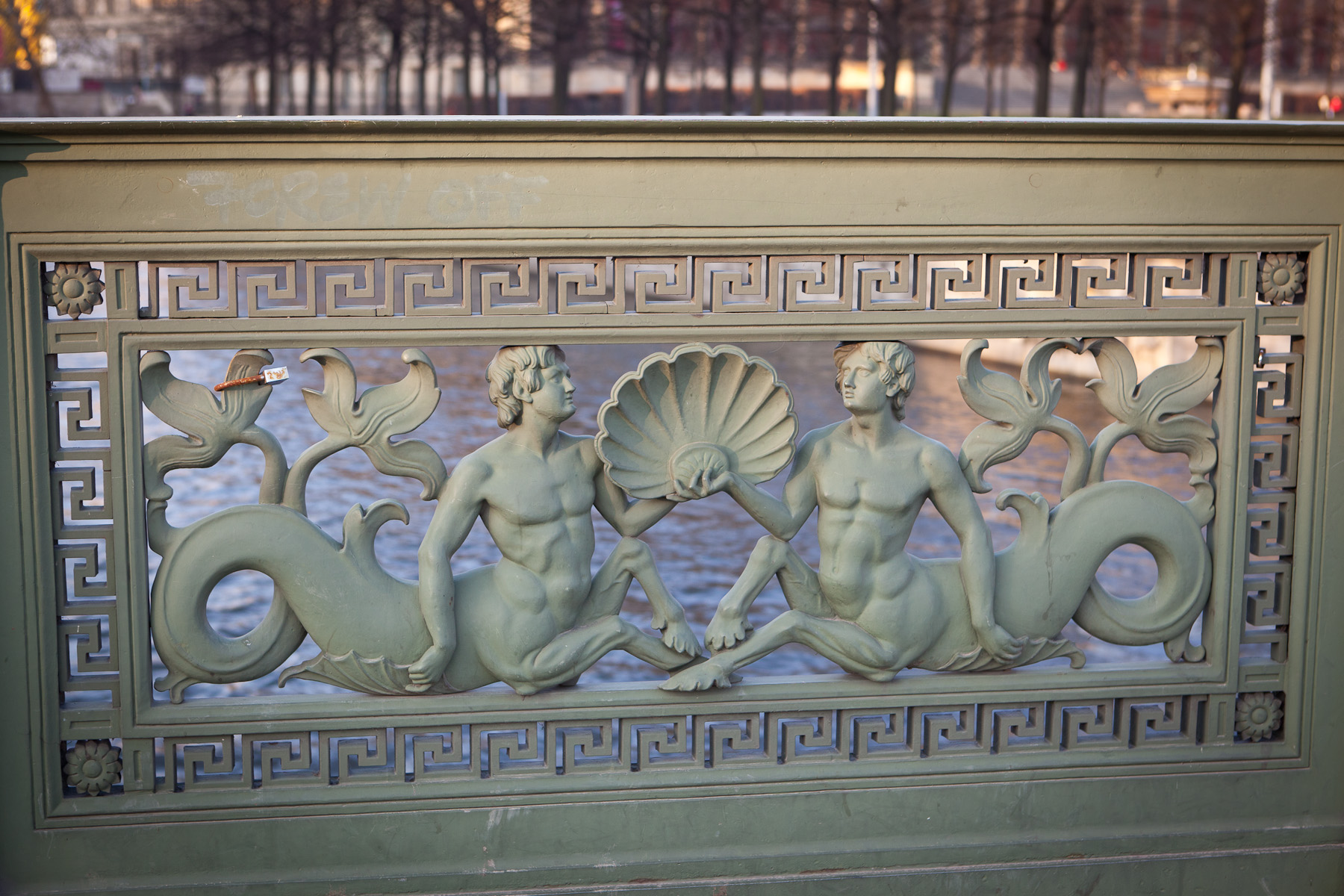
Balustrade of Palace Bridge, Berlin, 1824

In Saint Petersburg, cast iron was used on the many bridges, sometimes as the supporting structure, but especially for the decorative railings and sculptural embellishments, including the chain-suspension 1826 Bank Bridge, with its distinctive cast iron griffin sculptures and elaborate balustrades, the 1840 Pevchesky Bridge, the 1842 Anichkov Bridge (a copy of the Berlin Castle Bridge), and more seahorses on the 1843–1850 Annunciation Bridge.

=== Prefabricated and transportable buildings ===
Since it could be used for all the structural members that would be cast in a foundry and then transported to site for erection, it was soon realised it could just as easily be transported anywhere in the world. The Commissioner's House of the Royal Naval Dockyard, Bermuda designed by Edward Holl and built in the 1820s, is considered to be the first residence that used cast iron structure, for the verandahs, and floor and roof framing, and proved the concept of prefabrication and transportation long distances. Designers and foundries in the UK, France and Germany went on to produce all kinds of prefabricated cast iron structures and items for shipping to the colonies, from decorative elements to structural components to entire buildings. During the Victorian gold rush in Australia in the 1850s hundreds of various types of prefabricated structures were shipped out from foundries in England and Scotland, in timber, cast or wrought iron, or a combination, often with corrugated iron for the walls and roof. They included houses, stores, at least three complete churches, and an entire theatre; the most elaborate surviving structure in Australia is the completely cast iron Corio Villa, in Geelong. There are at least 100 surviving or part surviving prefabricated buildings, which in 2021 were to be nominated for World Heritage significance.

Markets were a type of structure that lent themselves to prefabrication and shipping, such as the structure of the Mercado Centrale in Santiago, Chile, which was shipped out from Glasgow firm Laidlaw & Sons in 1869. The Marché en Fer (Iron Market) in Port-au-Prince, Haiti, fabricated in Paris, was reputedly intended as a railway station for Cairo in 1891 but was purchased by the Haitian government instead.

An early type of completely prefabricated building was the large storage shed at dockyards. The Boat Shed (Number 78) at Sheerness Naval Dockyards, built 1856–60, is constructed entirely of a cast and wrought iron members, braced as portal frames, with extensive window and timber infill panels forming the external walls. Though not entirely of cast iron, it is the earliest large metal framed building still standing, and a pioneer in the development metal frames.

Watson's Hotel in Mumbai was prefabricated in England and built in 1867–69, using brick infill panels in a heavy and decorative cast-iron frame and is one of the largest completely cast iron framed building (as opposed to market or shed) in the world. Possibly the largest prefabricated cast iron structure is the Bulgarian St. Stephen Church in Istanbul, shipped out from Vienna in the late 1890s.

=== French use, integrated with decorative scheme ===
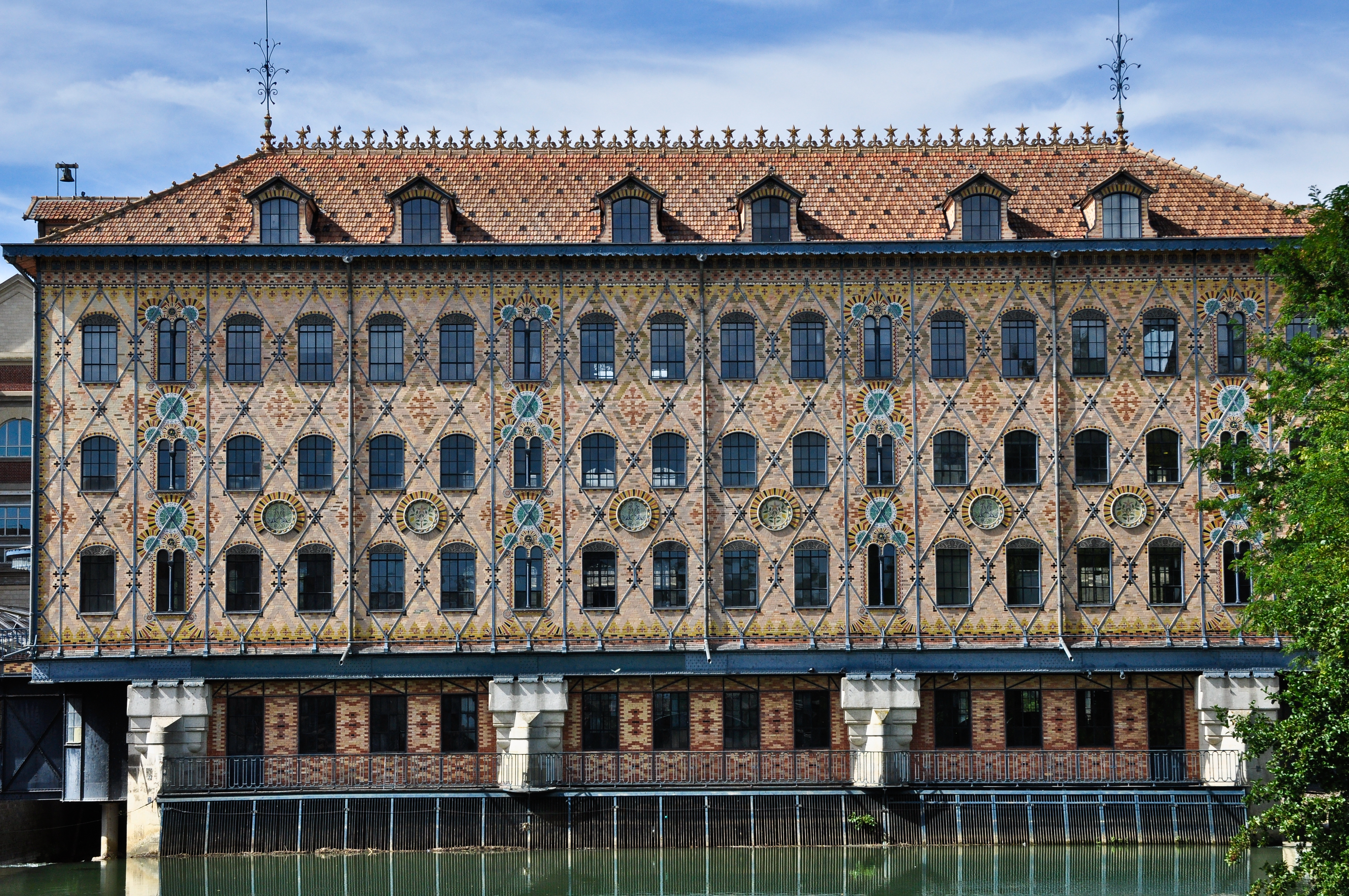
Menier Chocolate Factory, Noisiel, 1872

The Menier Chocolate Mill in Noisiel, completed in 1872, is often cited as the first building with an expressed metal frame. It was not however the first given earlier examples, but it is one of the most attractive (and some of the framing is hidden by the bricks). Designed by Jules Saulnier, it was an expression of a French approach that included an exposed metal frame as part of an overall decorative scheme, often using polychrome brick and tiles, with other examples later in date.

=== Verandahs and porches ===
The use of decorative cast iron as railings, fences and balconettes gradually gained popularity in Regency Britain and post-Napoleonic France as a cheaper alternative to the wrought-iron railings that only the wealthy could afford. The idea was exported to the colonies of both countries with hot climates as porches or verandahs, where it formed both decoration and structure.

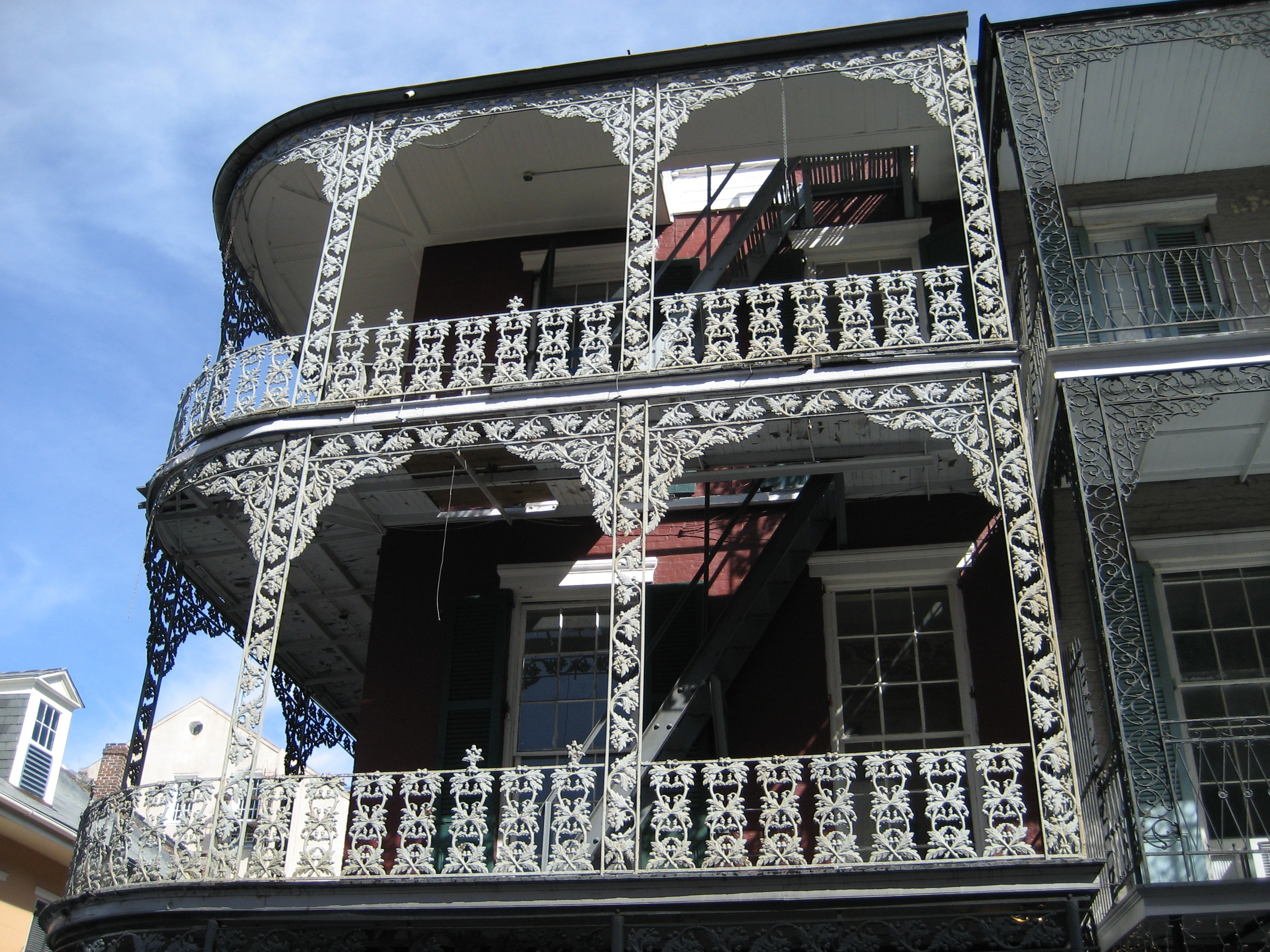
New Orleans cast iron 'gallery', 1850s

New Orleans' French Quarter has the most famous and elaborate examples and the greatest concentration, with light, lacy often multi-level porches (known in New Orleans as galleries) on over 400 buildings, transforming the area from the 1850s to 1880s. A few similar porches can be found in Savannah's Historic District, and the Church Hill and Jackson Ward neighborhoods in Richmond, though there it is mostly used for stair, porch and balcony railings. Numerous foundries in all three cities produced unique ornamental and structural designs in cast iron.

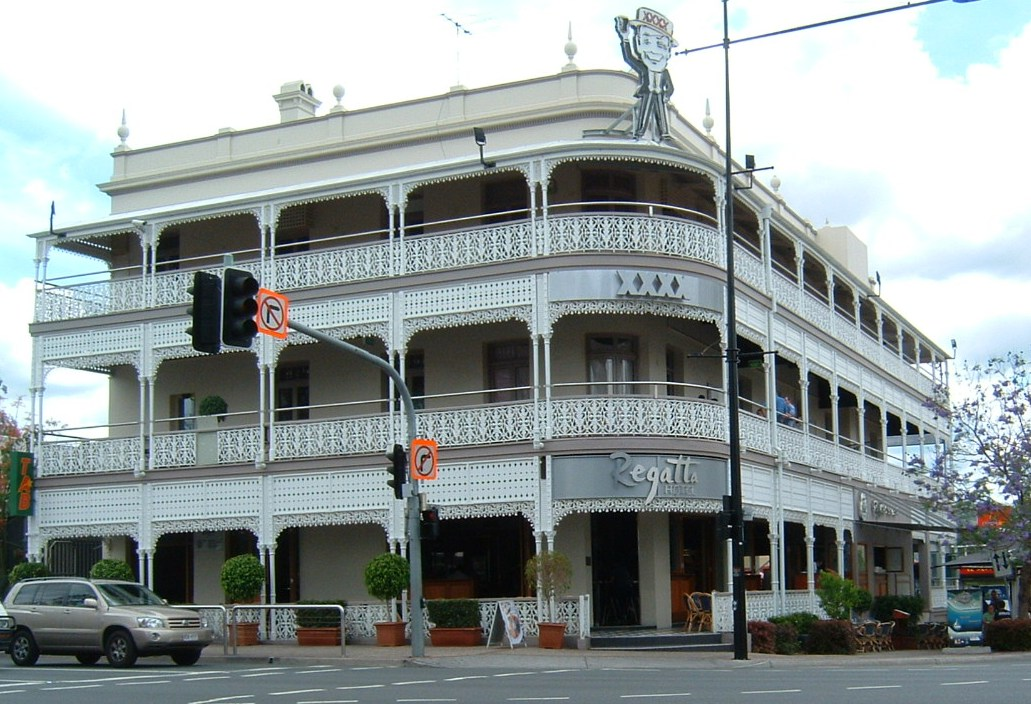
Regatta Hotel 1886, Toowong, Brisbane

In Australia, similar porches of usually only one or two levels, known as verandas, decorated with 'cast-iron lace', became a standard feature, shading the fronts of nearly every house, terrace house, pub and shop from the 1850s into the 1900s. Foundries in most cities and (with 42 in Melbourne alone) and many country towns began by reproducing imported designs in the 1850s and then developing their own, sometimes featuring Australian fauna such as cockatoos and koalas, but most featured flowing classically derived or vine-like patterns. After a period in the 1950s–60s when cast iron verandahs were routinely demolished, since the late 1970s they made a revival, and numerous foundries still provide historic patterns to order. Decorative cast iron used in a similar way can be found in other former British colonies including South Africa, Malaysia and India.

=== Cast-iron facades ===
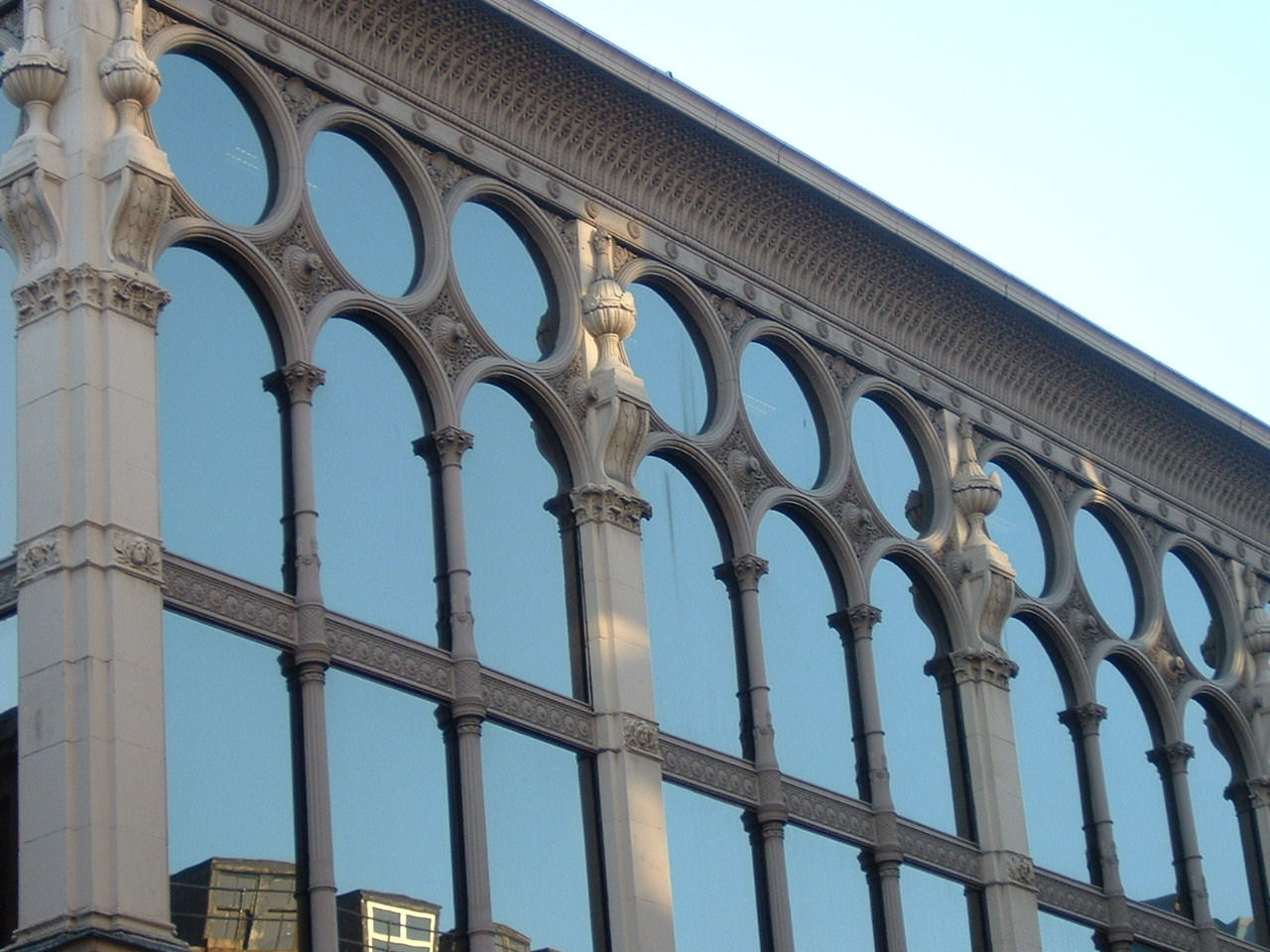
Close-up view of cast-iron detailing at the Ca d'Oro Building in Glasgow, Scotland, erected in 1872

In the 1840s the cheapness and malleability of cast iron led James Bogardus of New York City to develop the idea of buildings using cast iron for complete decorative facades, which were far cheaper than traditional carved-stone, but could be painted to give the appearance of stone. His first was put up in 1848, quickly followed by many more, and he promoted the idea in a pamphlet Cast Iron Buildings: Their Construction and Advantages (1858). The idea was taken up by other notable pioneer Daniel D. Badger, whose iron works in the East Village turned out "some of the most dramatic iron buildings this country has ever seen", most notably the E. V. Haughwout Building in 1857. Particularly popular for warehouse / industrial buildings, but also for department stores, the streets of the SoHo and Tribeca areas of New York and what is now known as the Old City area of Philadelphia were soon lined with elaborate Renaissance Revival style facades. Warehouse districts in smaller US cities soon also saw many examples, but most have been demolished. The West Main District, Louisville Kentucky has the most surviving examples, with about 10 in a three block stretch. The Skidmore/Old Town Historic District in Portland, Oregon also features a number of examples remaining from a once extensive district.

Fully cast iron facades were also sometimes used for more prestigious places, such as the Ladd & Bush Bank, in Salem, Oregon, 1869, which features elaborate patterned blockwork and arch voussoirs. The Gilsey House Hotel at 1200 Broadway in New York opened in 1871, and is also remarkably ornate, manufactured by Badger with relatively plain lower levels topped by a florid double level French Second Empire style mansard. In Europe, complete cast-iron facades were never popular, except in the growing industrial city of Glasgow, Scotland, where a few survive, such as the 1872 Ca d’Oro Building.

=== Greenhouses, exhibitions and markets ===
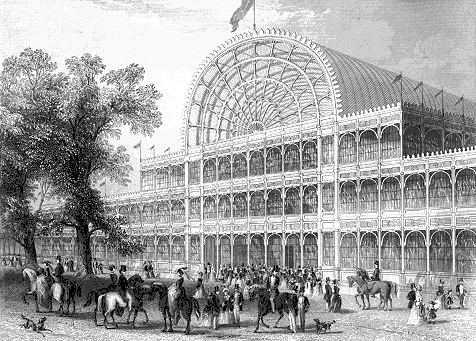
Crystal Palace, London, 1851

Cast iron also became the standard support structure in the construction of larger greenhouses. English architect and gardener Joseph Paxton experimented with frameworks of timber, cast-iron and glass in the 1820s and 30s, designing ever larger structures, often prefabricated, culminating in the monumental Crystal Palace exhibition hall built in London in 1851. The success of the concept spawned many imitators, as both exhibition halls and greenhouses, which were almost universally constructed of cast iron (sometimes in combination with wrought-iron) in the 19th century. The Palm House at the Belfast Botanic Gardens, completed in 1840, is an early surviving example.

Cast iron was particularly useful to provide the entire structure of market halls, with a solid roof and open sides or highlight windows, and by the end of the 19th century nearly every new market in Europe (and most in Latin America) were cast-iron, some vast and elaborate, such as the 1850s Les Halles in Paris (demolished).

An interesting application is for a winter garden, with a solid roof but extensive glass walls, such as the Spa Colonnade in the spa town of Mariánské Lázně in the Czech Republic, built in 1889, which features an elaborate roof structure and extensive Neo-Baroque decorations in the facade, all in cast iron.

=== Arcades ===
The structure of the glass roof of Milan's Galleria, 1865–77

Cast iron was quickly adapted to allow ever wider glass roofs on the then new idea of glass-roofed shopping arcades in Paris in the first decades of the 19th century. The idea spread across Europe and the United States in ever grander structures, and the largest examples had vast arched roofs in cast iron, such as the Galleria Vittorio Emmanuel in Milan.

=== Roofs, domes and atriums ===
George Peabody Library, Baltimore, 1872

Cast iron was used for the construction of large domes, as early as 1811 with the huge dome of the Bourse de commerce in Paris, originally the Corn Market and clad in copper (later replaced with glass). The central four storey circular hall and towering glass dome of the long-demolished 1849 London Coal Exchange was an early and spectacular use of the material as both structure and architecture.

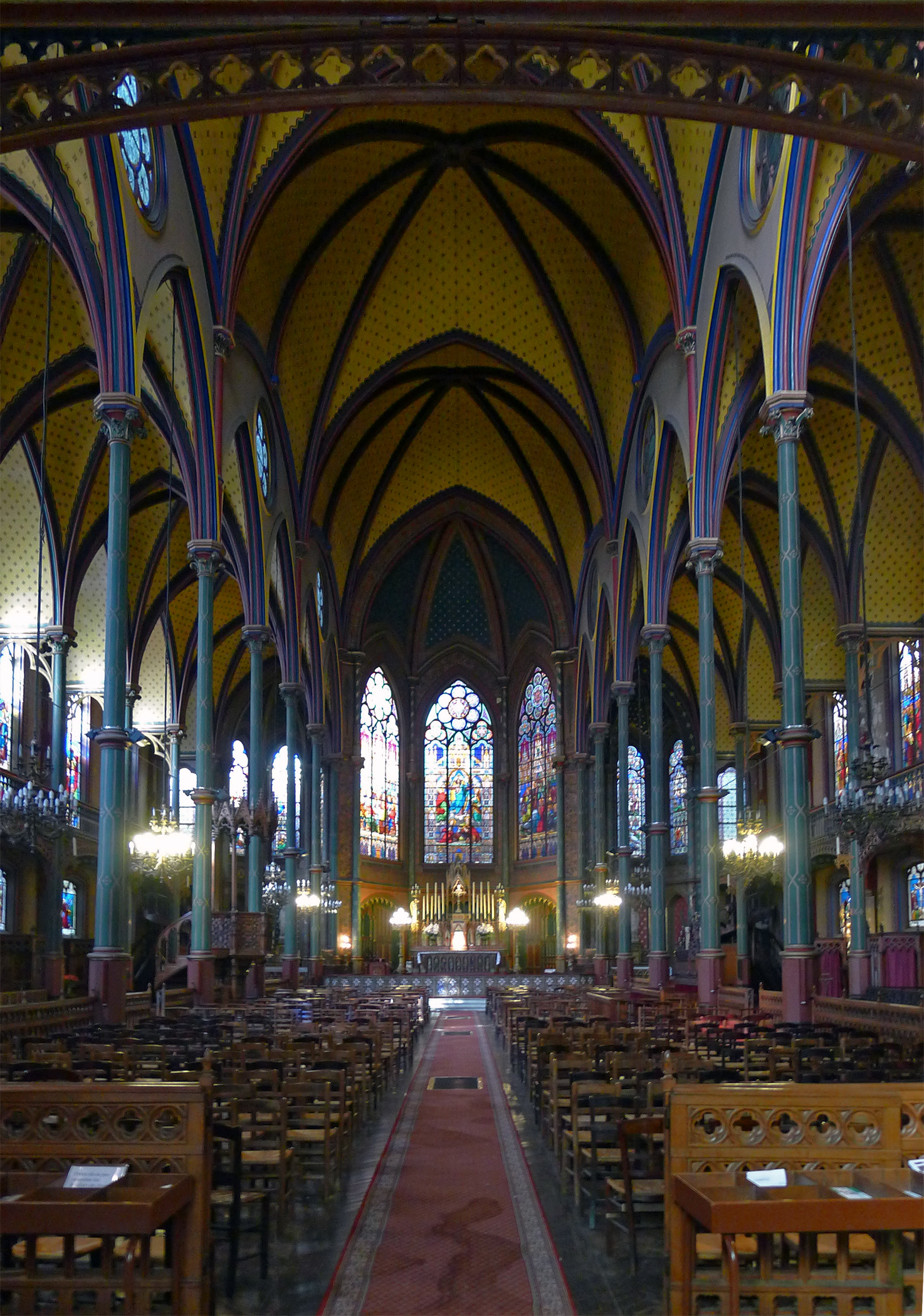
Eglise St-Eugene Ste-Cecile, 1837

The most famous example is the United States Capitol dome, built 1855–66 and made entirely of cast iron. The dome was designed by the architect Thomas Ustick Walter, and fabricated by the New York iron foundry, Janes, Fowler, Kirtland & Co. The dome consists of nearly 9 million pounds of cast iron. Another important example is the dome of Saint Isaac's Cathedral in St Petesburg, Russia, built in the 1830s.

The 1872 George Peabody Library in Baltimore is a similarly elaborate atrium with glass roof, where all the structural members are also decorative and made of cast iron. The lofty glass roof of Milan's Galleria, built 1865–77, is both a dome and glass roofed shopping arcade, the grandest ever built. Later glass roofs such as that of the Grand Palais in Paris employed wrought iron or steel.

Cast iron lent itself to creating thinner supports in churches. An early example dates from 1837, when architect Louis Auguste Boileau supported the interior of the Eglise St-Eugene Ste-Cecile in Paris on slim cast iron columns and ribbed vaulting imitating the Gothic style, but thinner than stone would have allowed.

Two famous examples of cast iron as both support and decoration of a roof on slender columns are the two great mid 19th century libraries of Paris, the double-arched roof of the Bibliothèque Sainte-Geneviève reading room, built 1843–51, by architect Henri Labrouste, who also designed an even more elegant multiple-domed reading room for the Bibliothèque nationale de France, built in 1861–68.

Towers

Though not an ideal material for the creation of free standing towers, in 1852 it was used to create a lookout structure, the King Frederick Augustus Tower, in Löbau, Germany, which features filagree patterns in Gothic and Classical styles. Elaborate gothic fillagree panels were also used for the Santa Justa Lift in Lisbon, Portugal, which opened in 1902; the underlying structure however is wrought iron.

=== Street furniture and park items ===
Cast iron, a durable material that could take on any shape, was also popular from the mid 19th century for street furniture. Not only park and building fences, often with elaborate gates, but also fountains, street lamps, bollards, tree grates and guards, as well as the UK red post box, and in Paris it was used for the elaborate advertising columns, newspaper kiosks and pissoirs the city is known for (though almost all are now contemporary reproductions in other materials). In the 1870s philanthropist Charles Wallace funded the installation of numerous ornate drinking fountains across Paris, and over 100 Wallace Fountains are still in use. Decorative street lamps in cast iron were used all over the world, from gas lamps in the second half of the 19th century to electric ones in the first decades of the 20th – a collection of examples used in California in the 1920s and 30s now form a display outside the Los Angeles County Museum of Art, called Urban Light. When underground trains were established in the 1890s–1900s, the stairs located in pavements were often housed in elaborate cast iron structures, notably the long demolished New York City Subway entrances (one survives at City Hall station outside New York City Hall), and the famous Art Nouveau Paris Métro entrances by Hector Guimard.

For the same reasons, cast iron was also popular for structures within parks and gardens, both public and private, as well as on public promenades, used for fencing, seating, lamp posts, large fountains and drinking fountains, statues, decorative bridges, covered walkways, gazebos and bandstands. The 1885 Morisco Kiosk in Mexico City is a particularly elaborate example of the latter (though this may be wrought rather than cast iron). The 1870s Victoria Embankment in London features particularly ornate examples, with entwined dolphins supporting elaborate lampposts, and benches with sphinxes or camels as end panels.

== Gallery ==
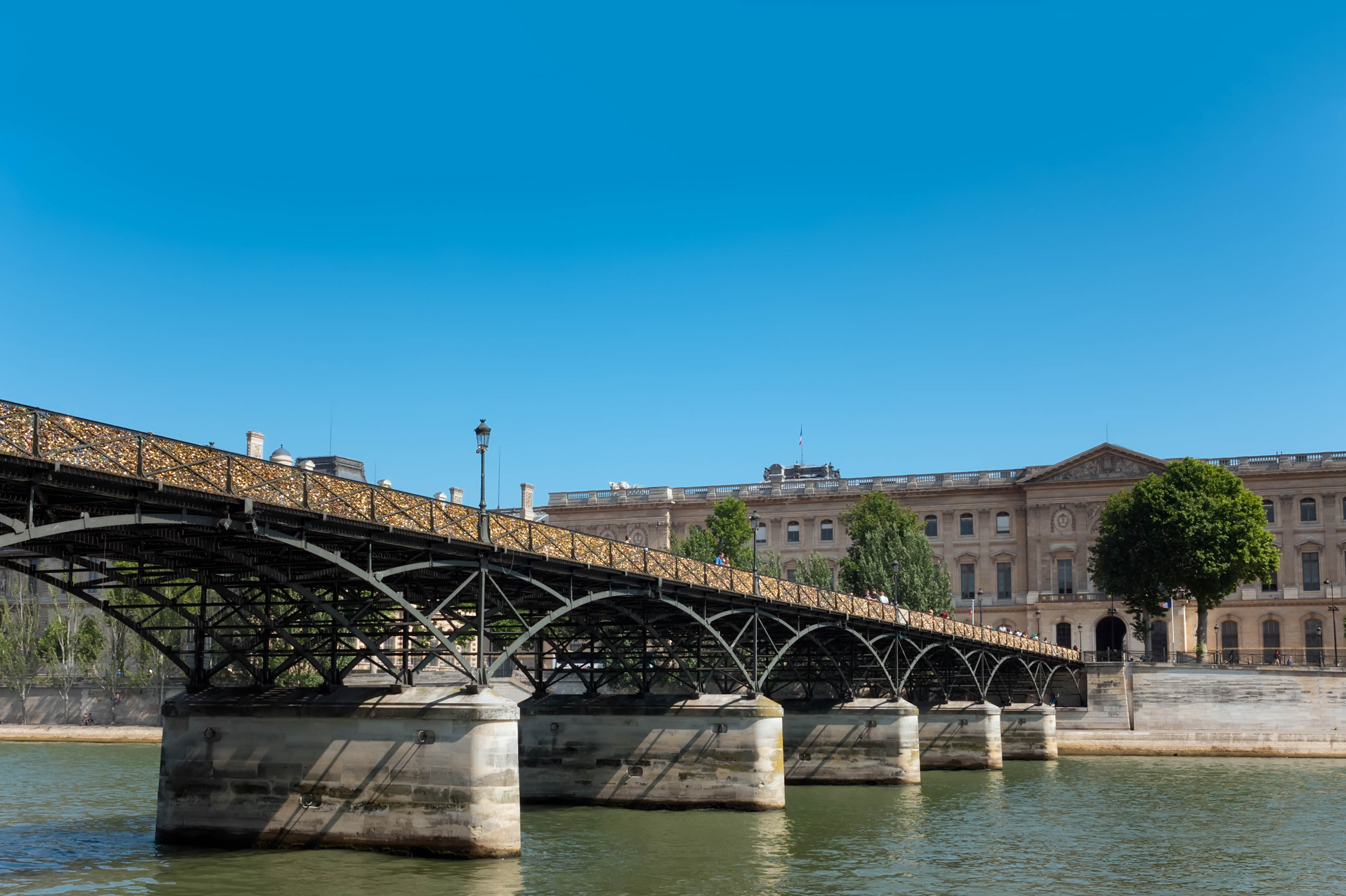
Pont Des Arts, Paris, 1804

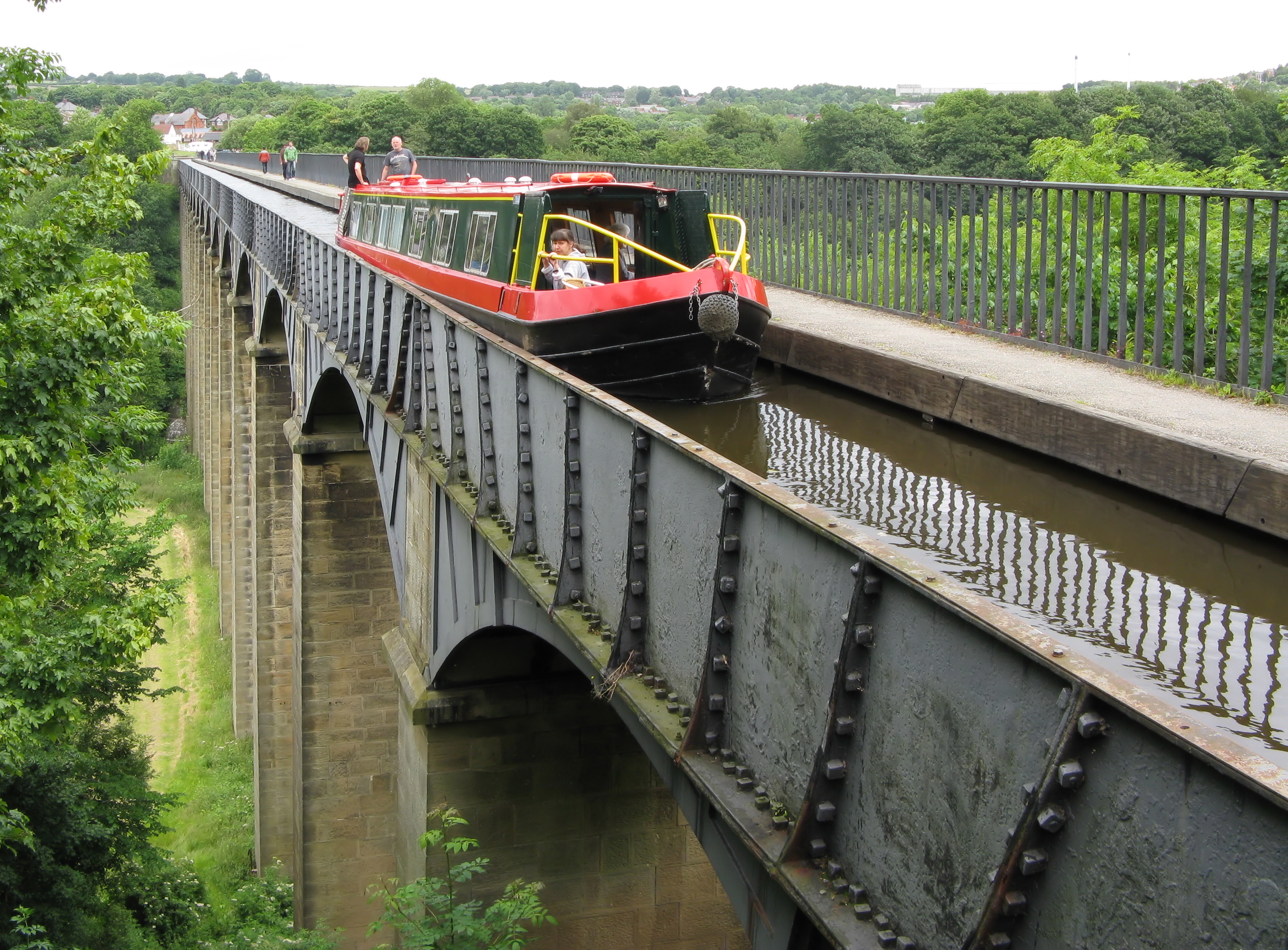
Pontcysyllte aqueduct, North Wales, 1805

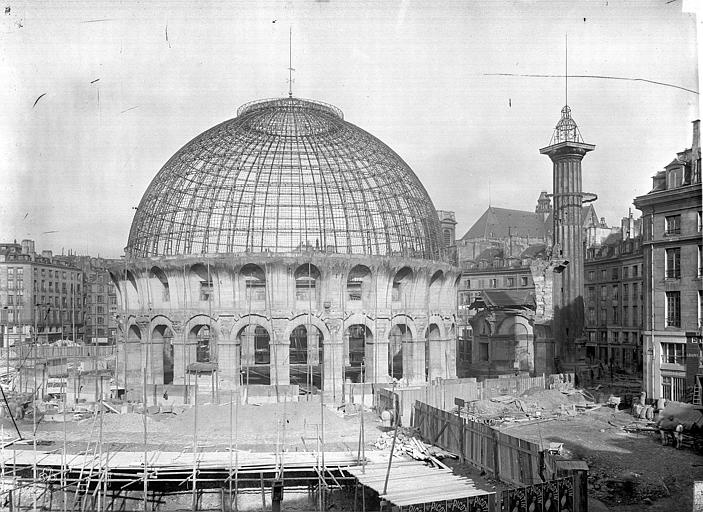
Bourse de Commerce dome, Paris, 1811 (photo 1880s)

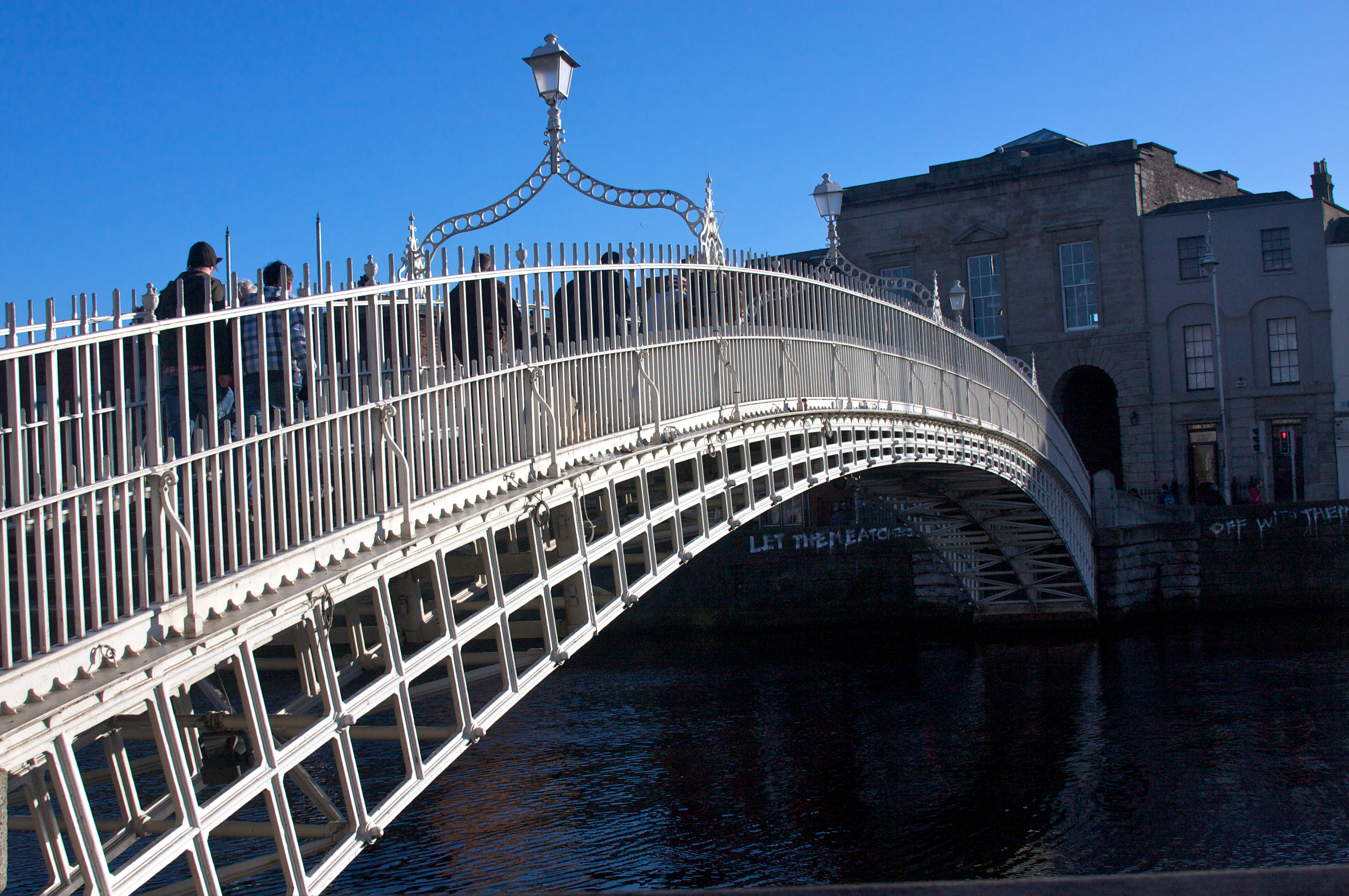
Ha'penny Bridge, Dublin, 1816

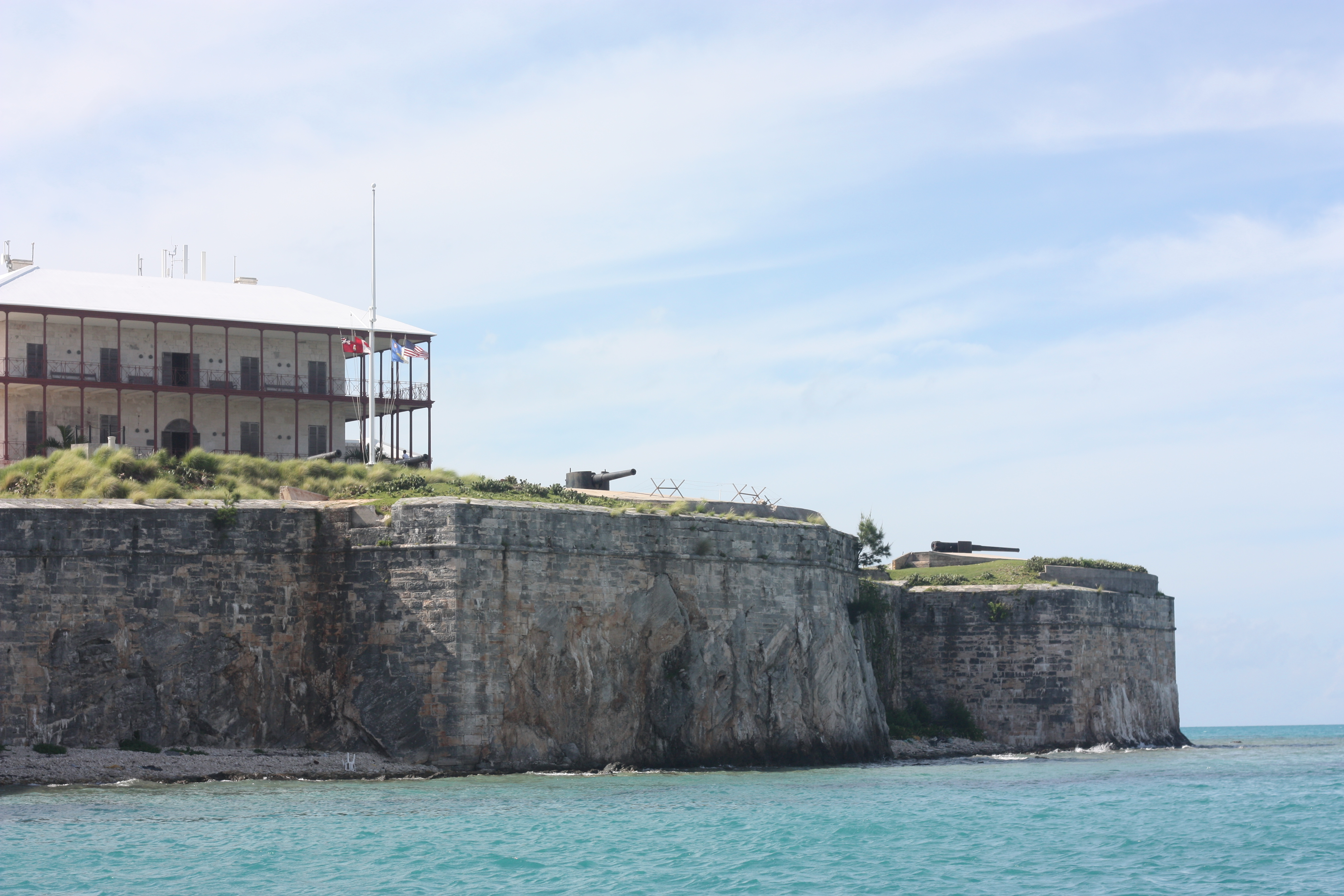
Commissioners House, Bermuda, 1820s

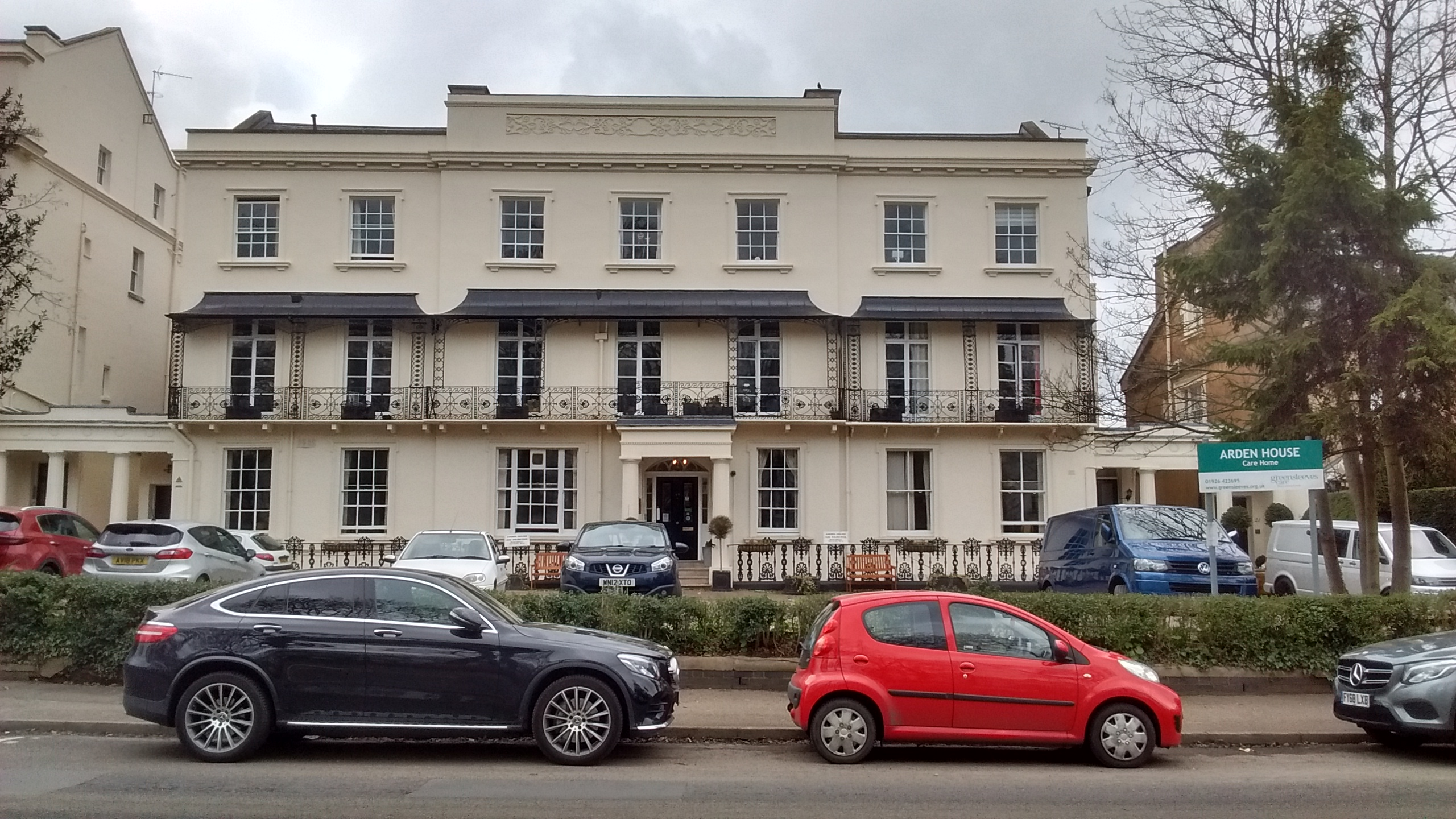
Cast iron balcony and railing, Arden House, Leamington Spa, England, 1832

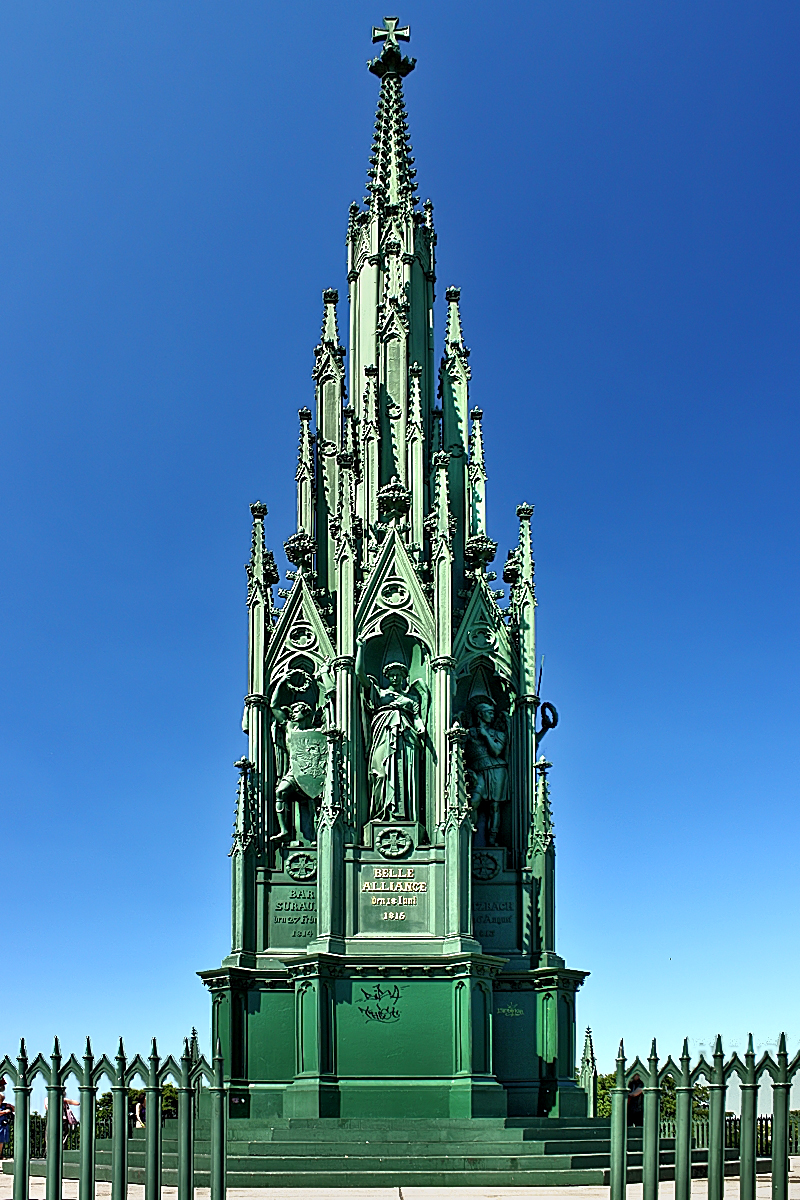
Kreuzberg Memorial, Berlin, 1821

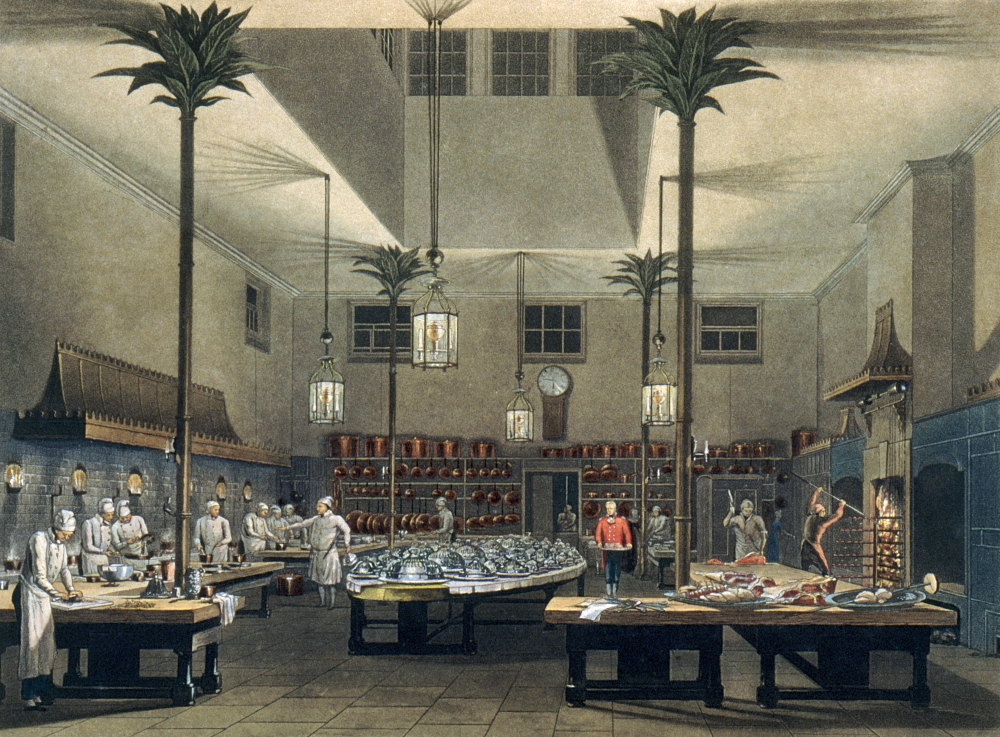
Kitchen with palm tree cast iron columns, Royal Pavilion, Brighton, c. 1820

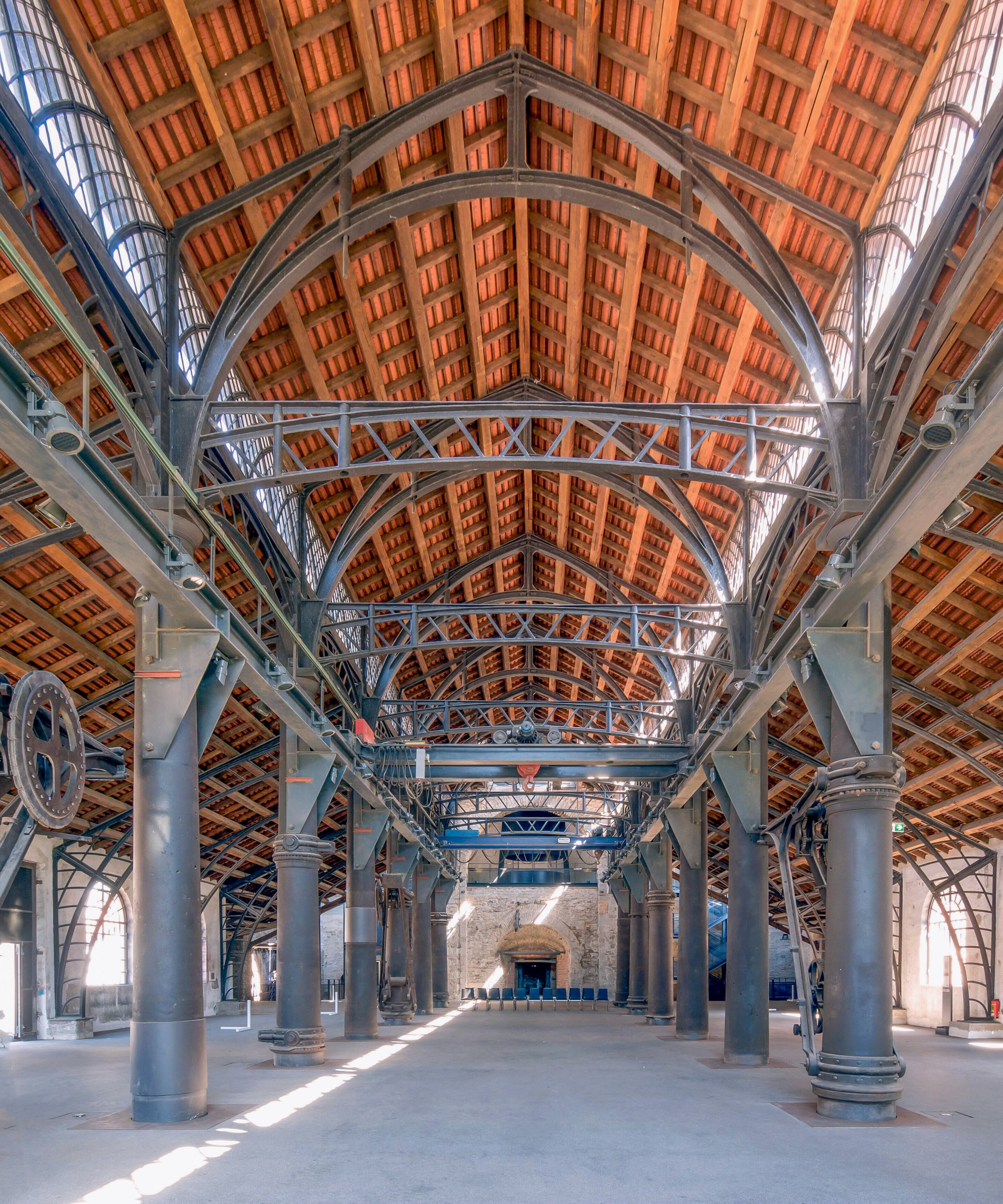
Sayn Foundry hall, Bendorf, Germany, 1830

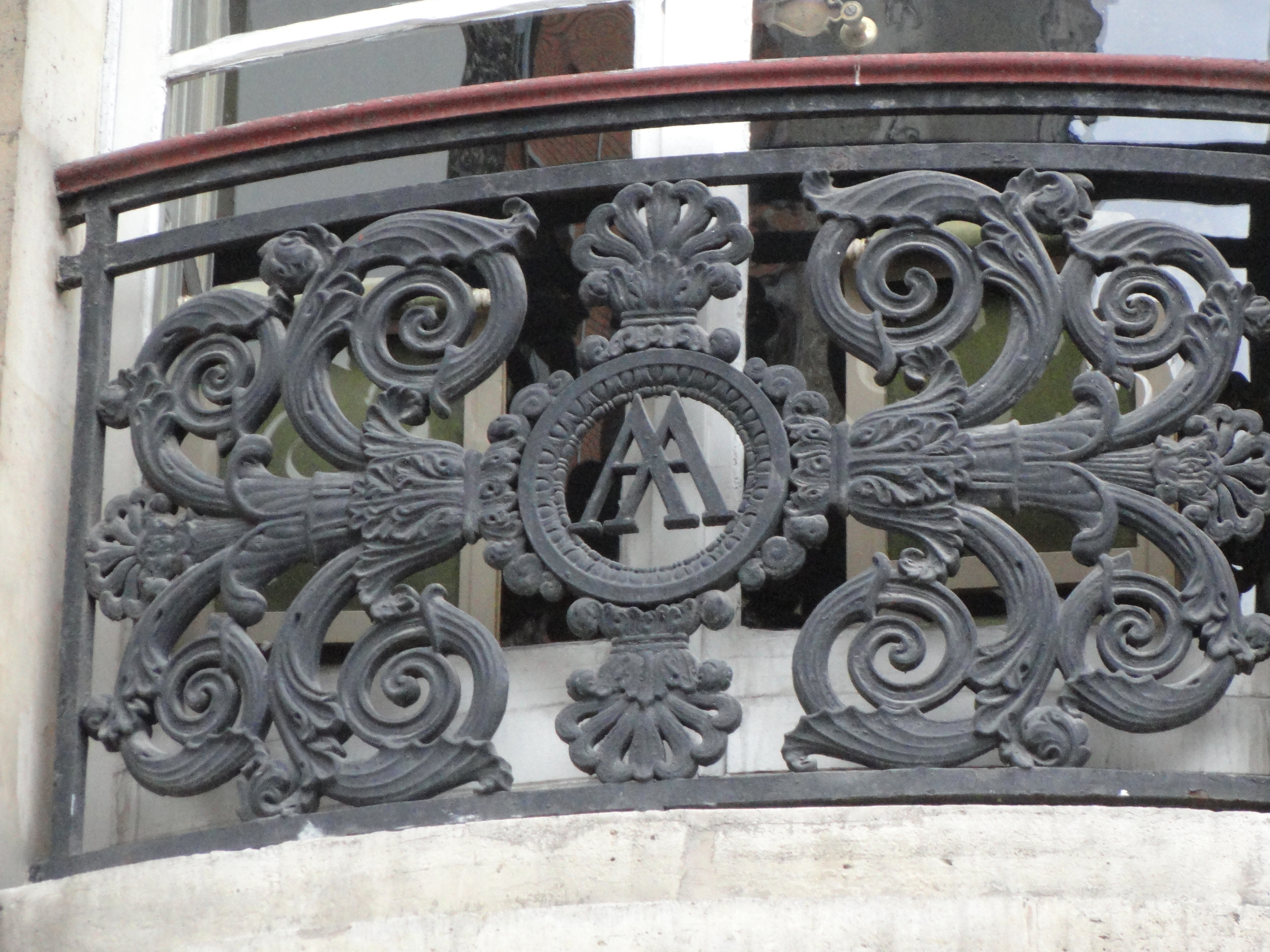
Cast iron balcony, town hall, 9th arrondissement, Paris, c. 1830

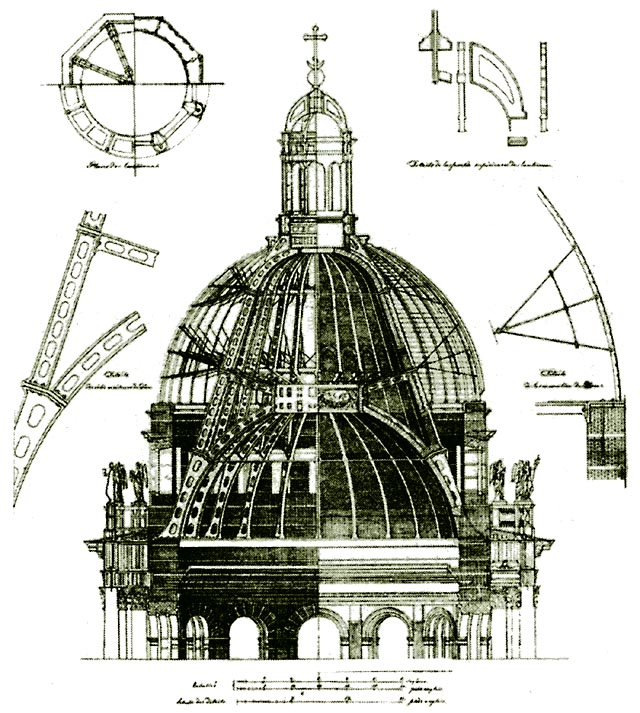
St Isaac's Cathedral dome structure, c. 1838

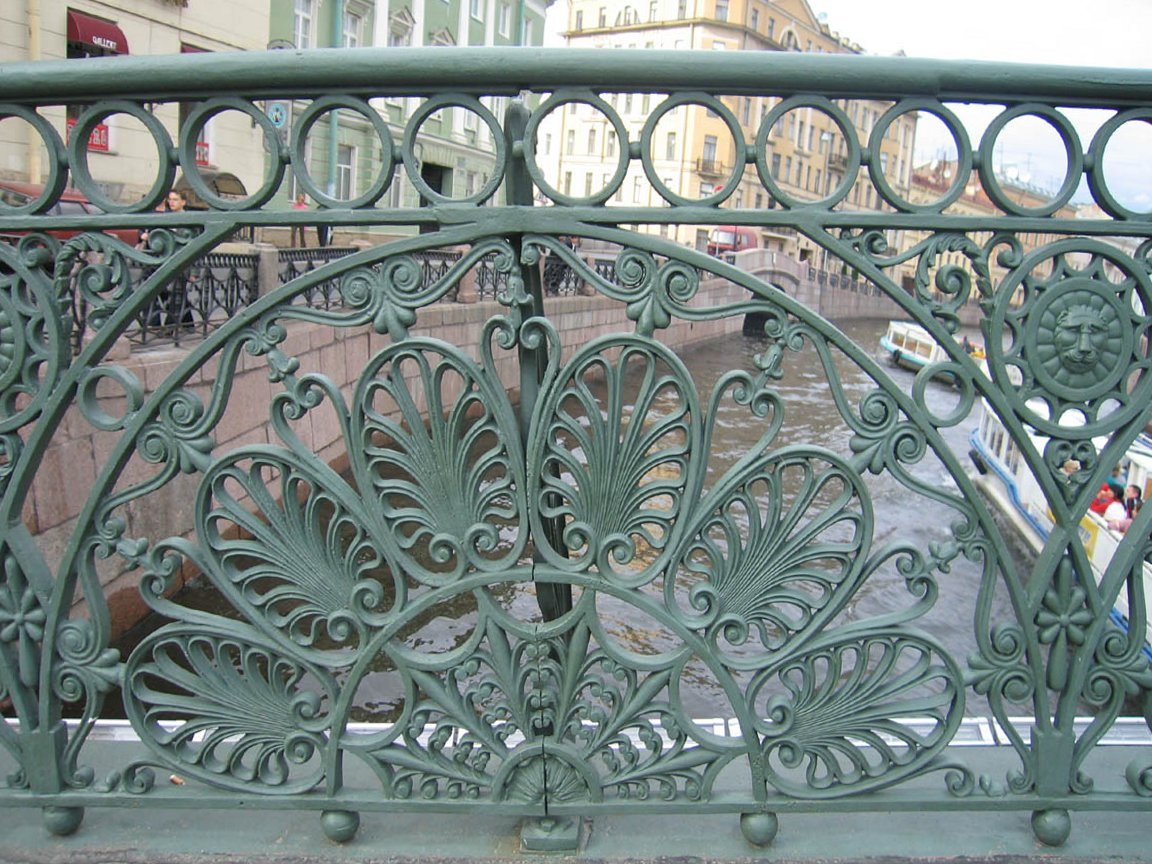
Pevchesky Bridge, St Petersburg, 1840

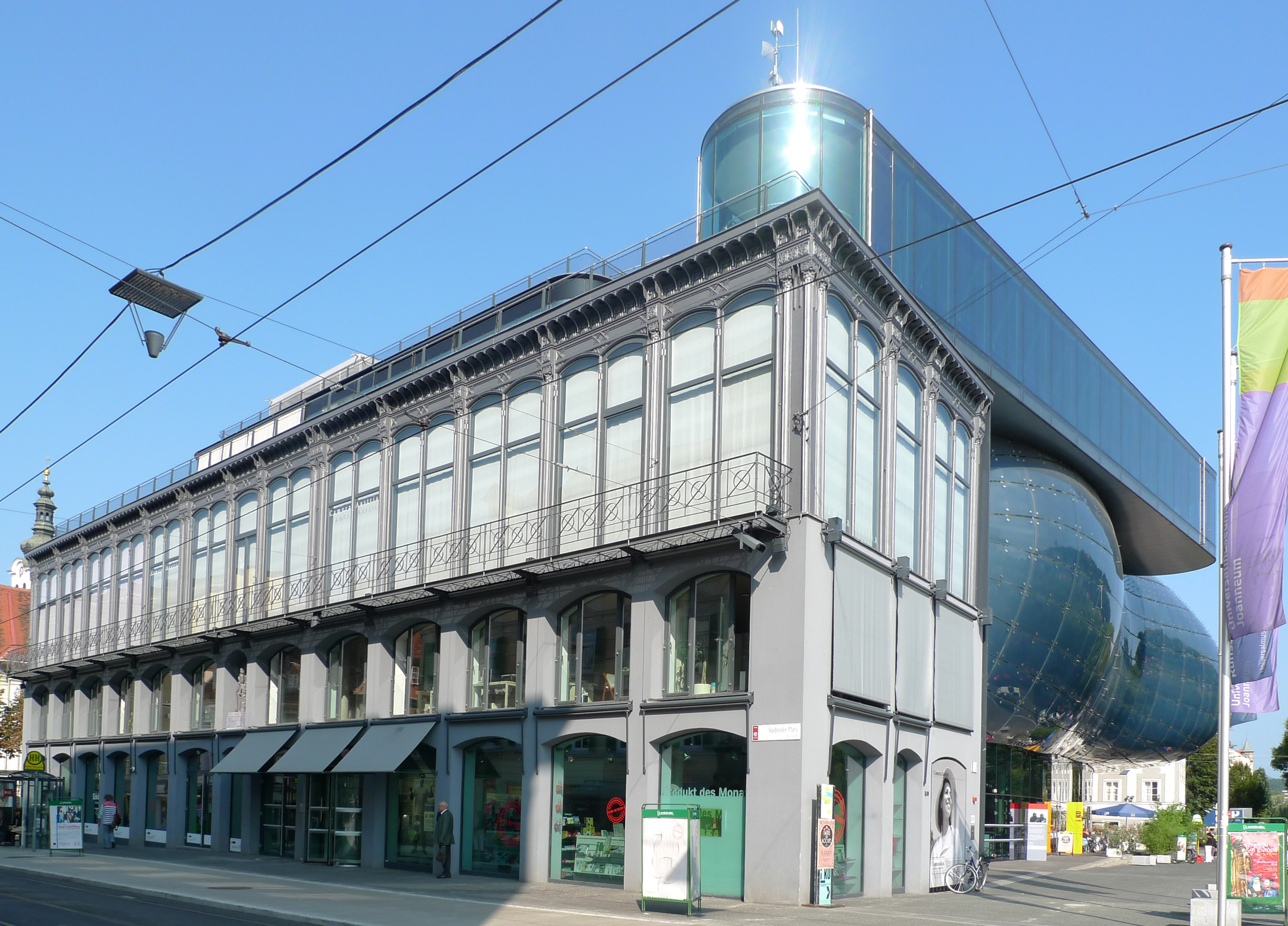
Eisernes Haus, 1848, today part of Kunsthaus Graz

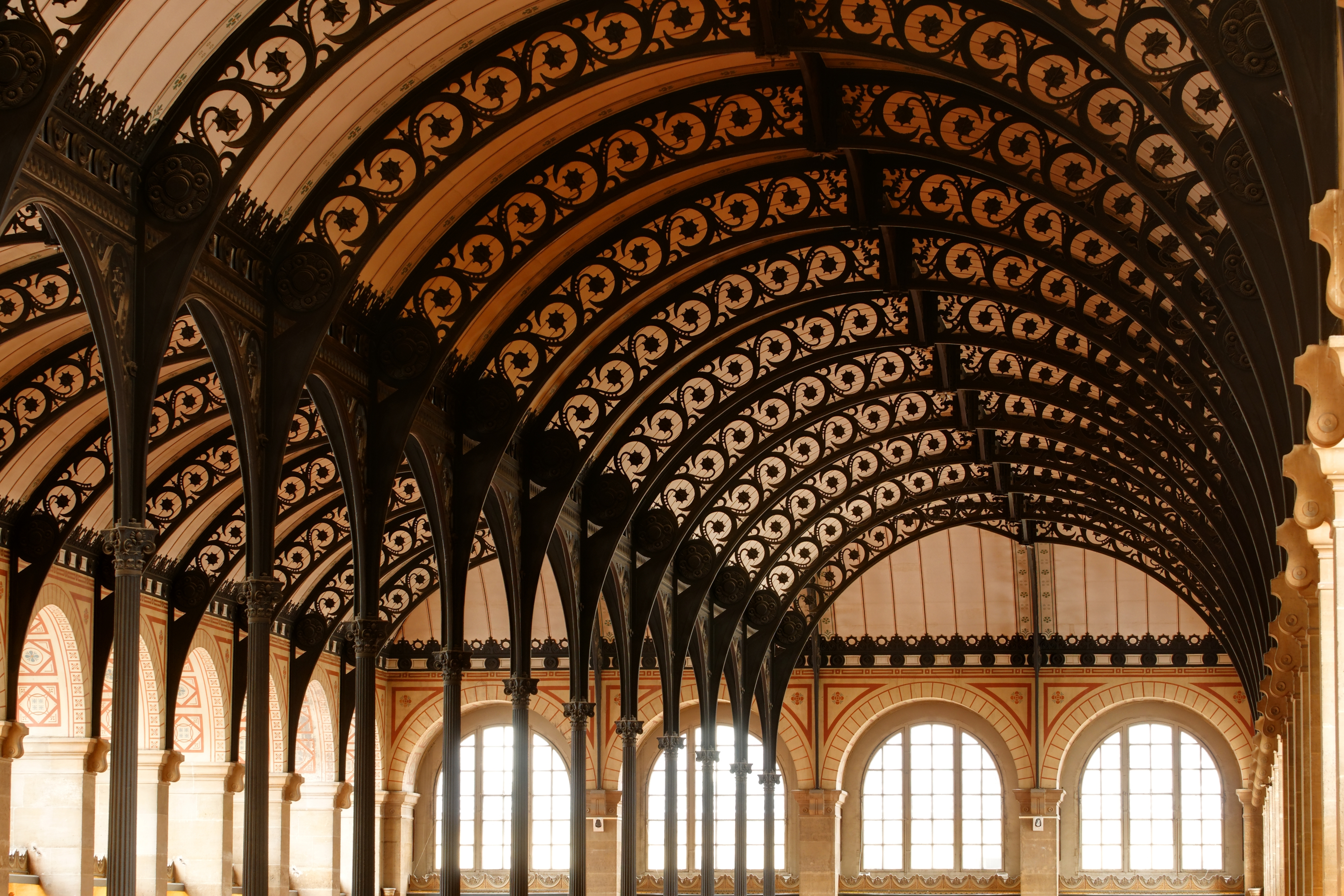
Bibliothèque Sainte-Genevieve, Paris, 1843–50

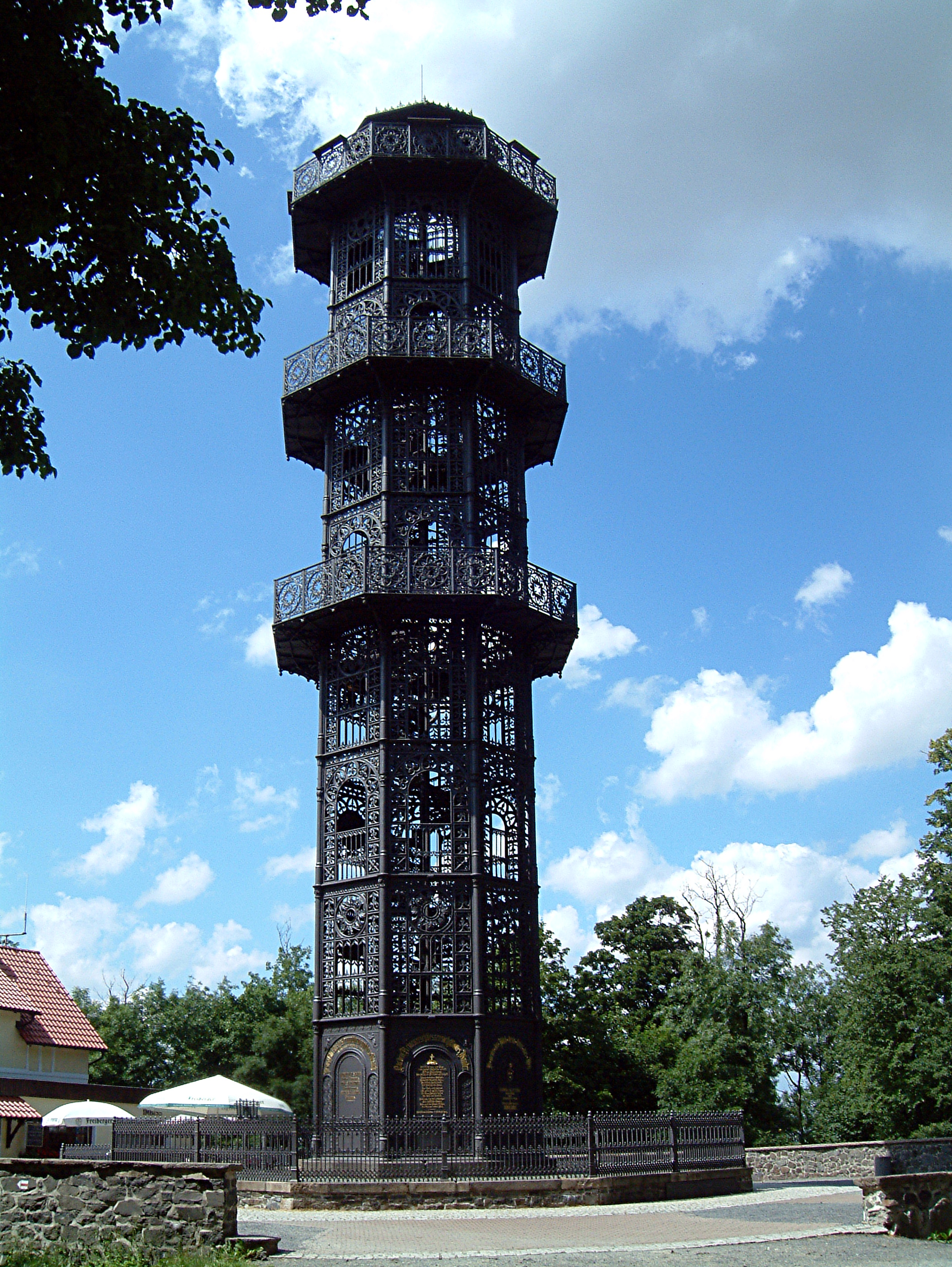
King Frederick Augustus Tower, Löbau, Germany 1852

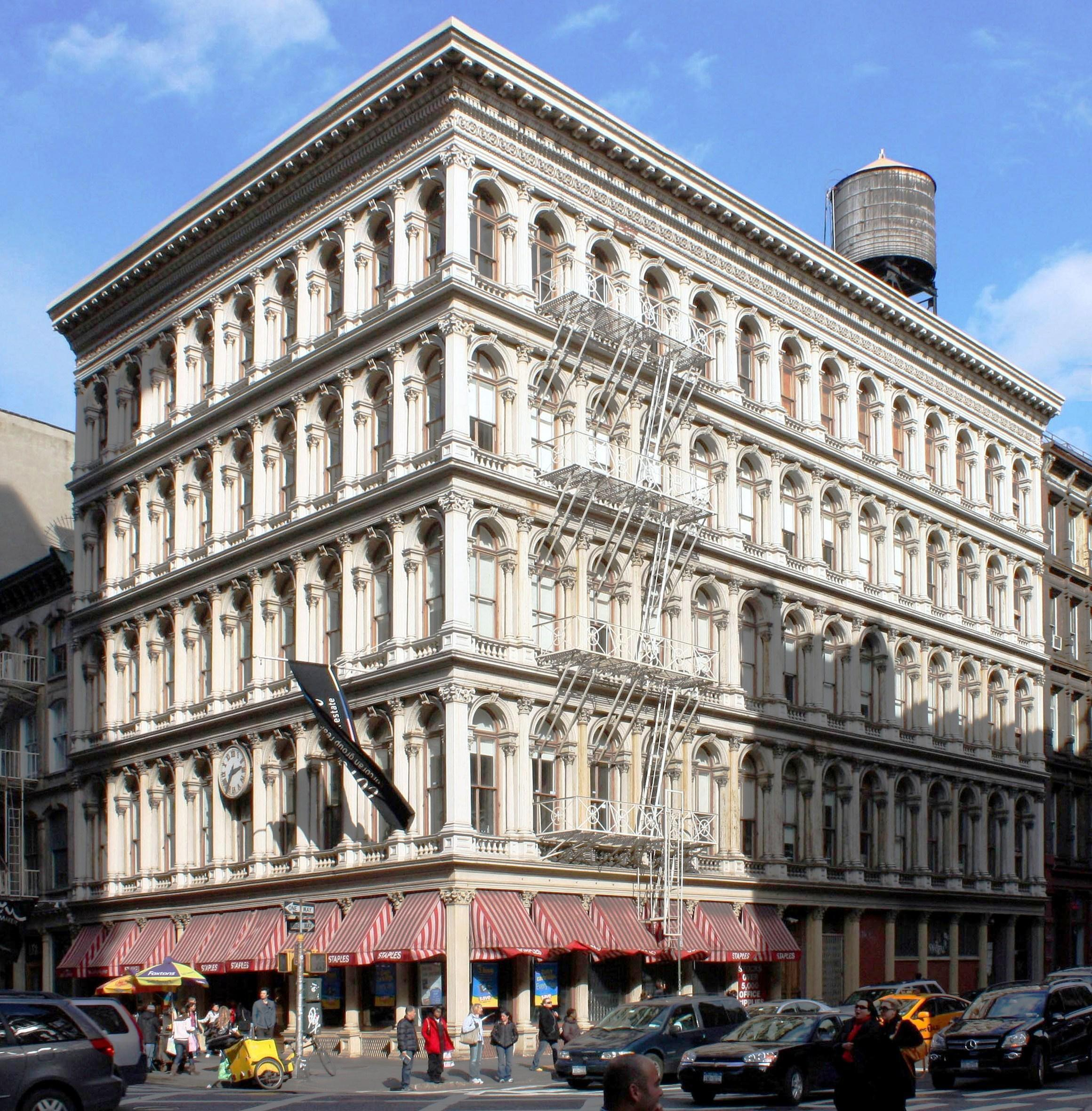
Haughwout Building, Soho, NY, 1856-7

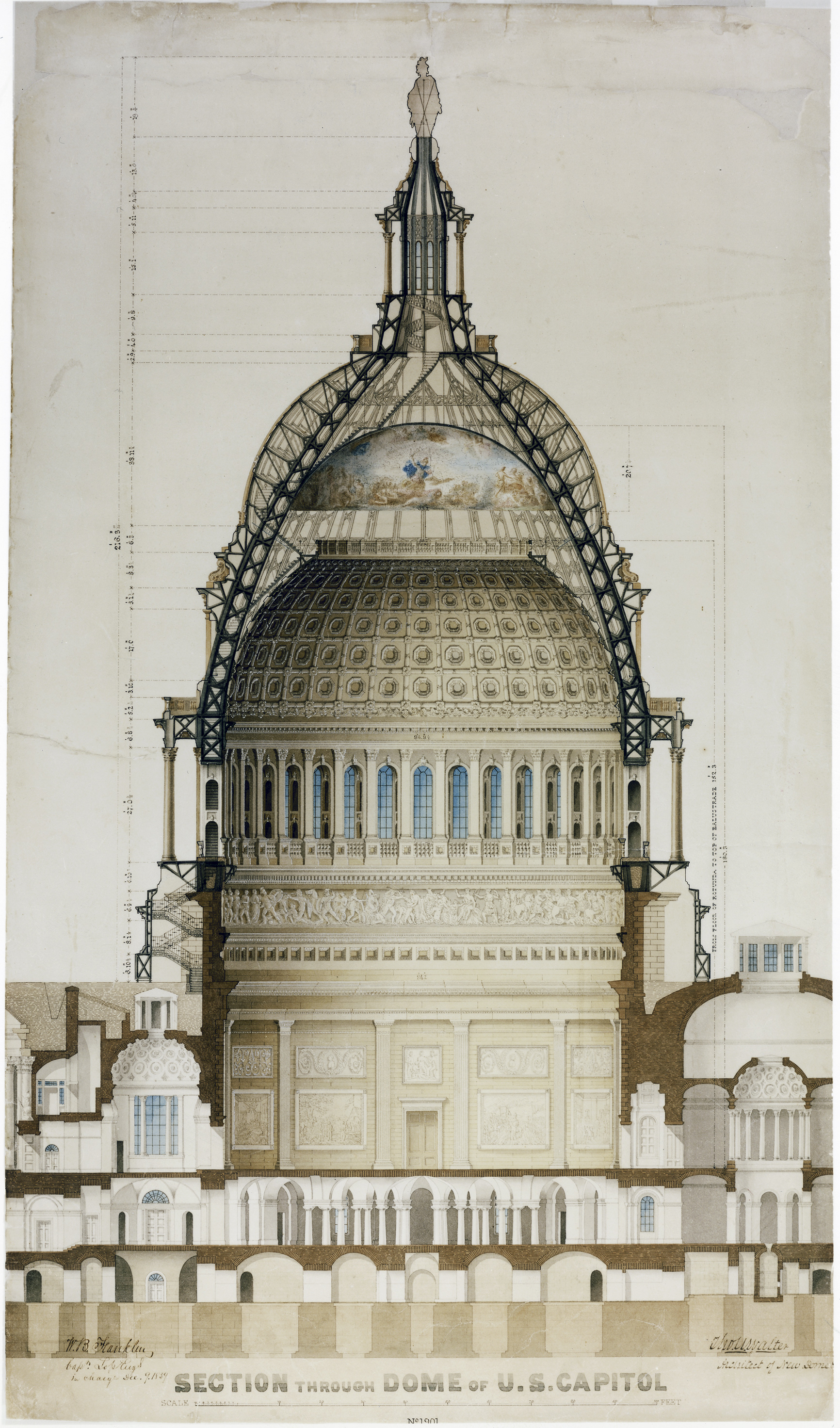
U.S. Capitol section, 1859

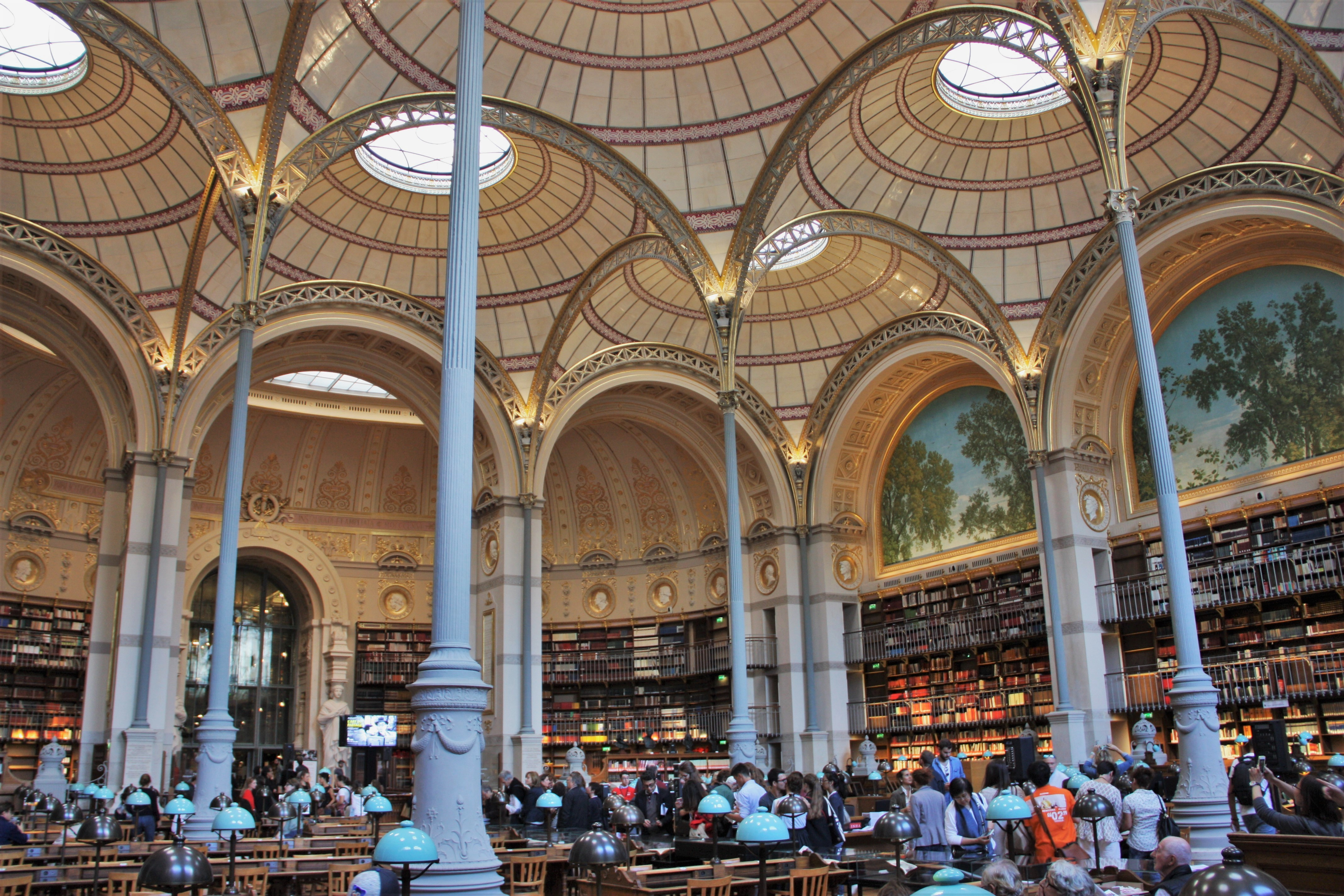
Salle Labrouste, Bibliothèque nationale de France, 1861–68

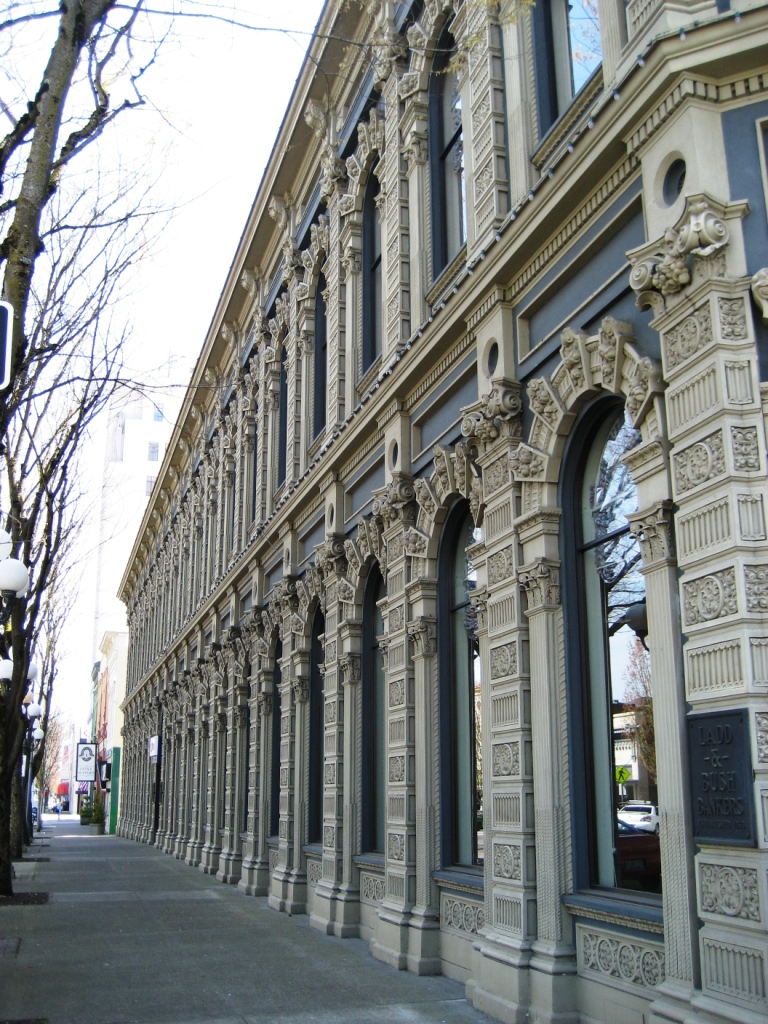
Ladd & Bush Bank, Salem, Oregon, 1868

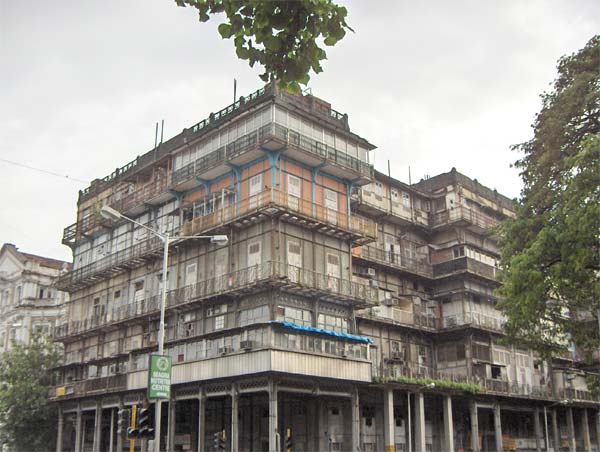
Watson's Hotel, Mumbai, 1869

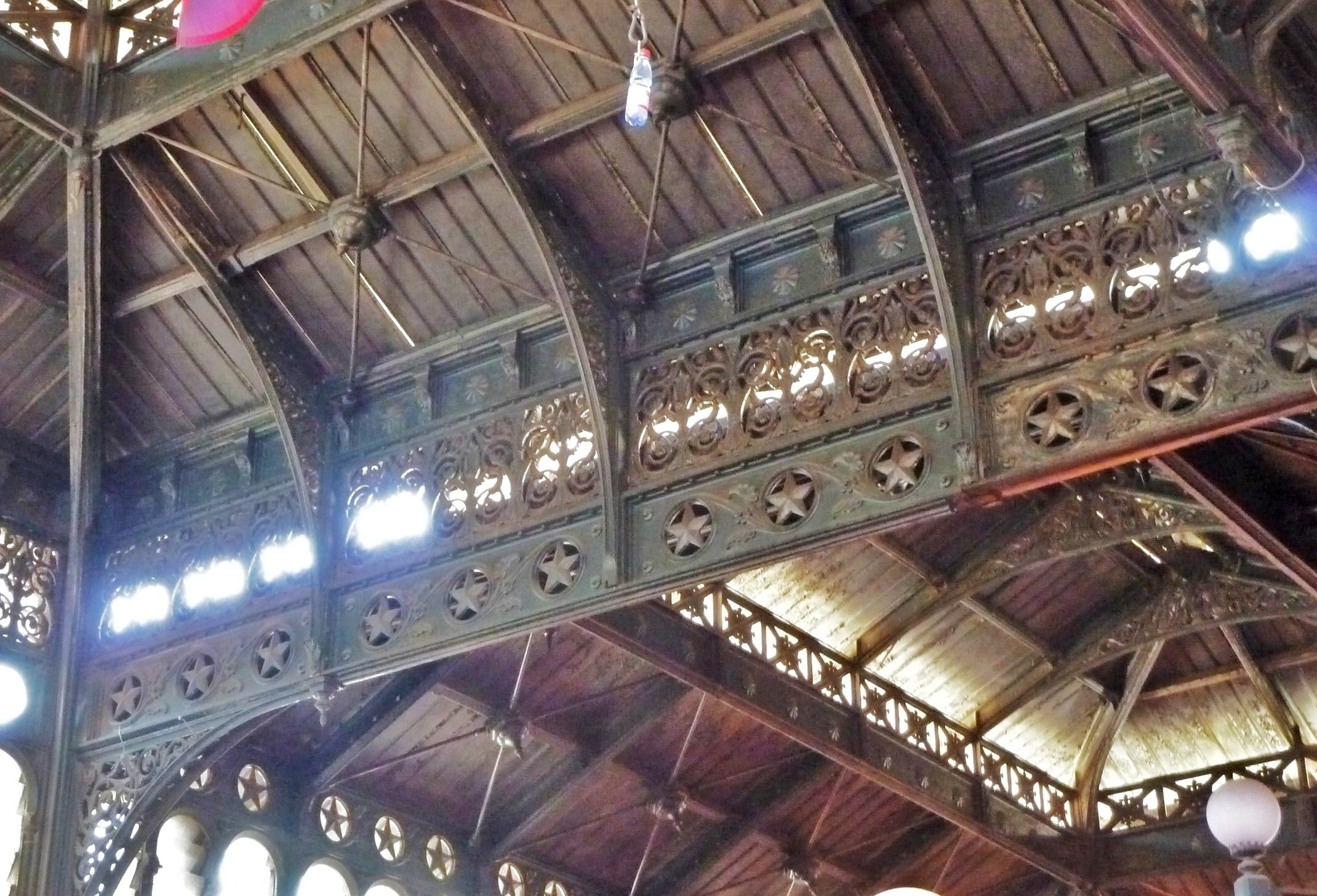
Mercado Central, Santiago, Chile, 1869

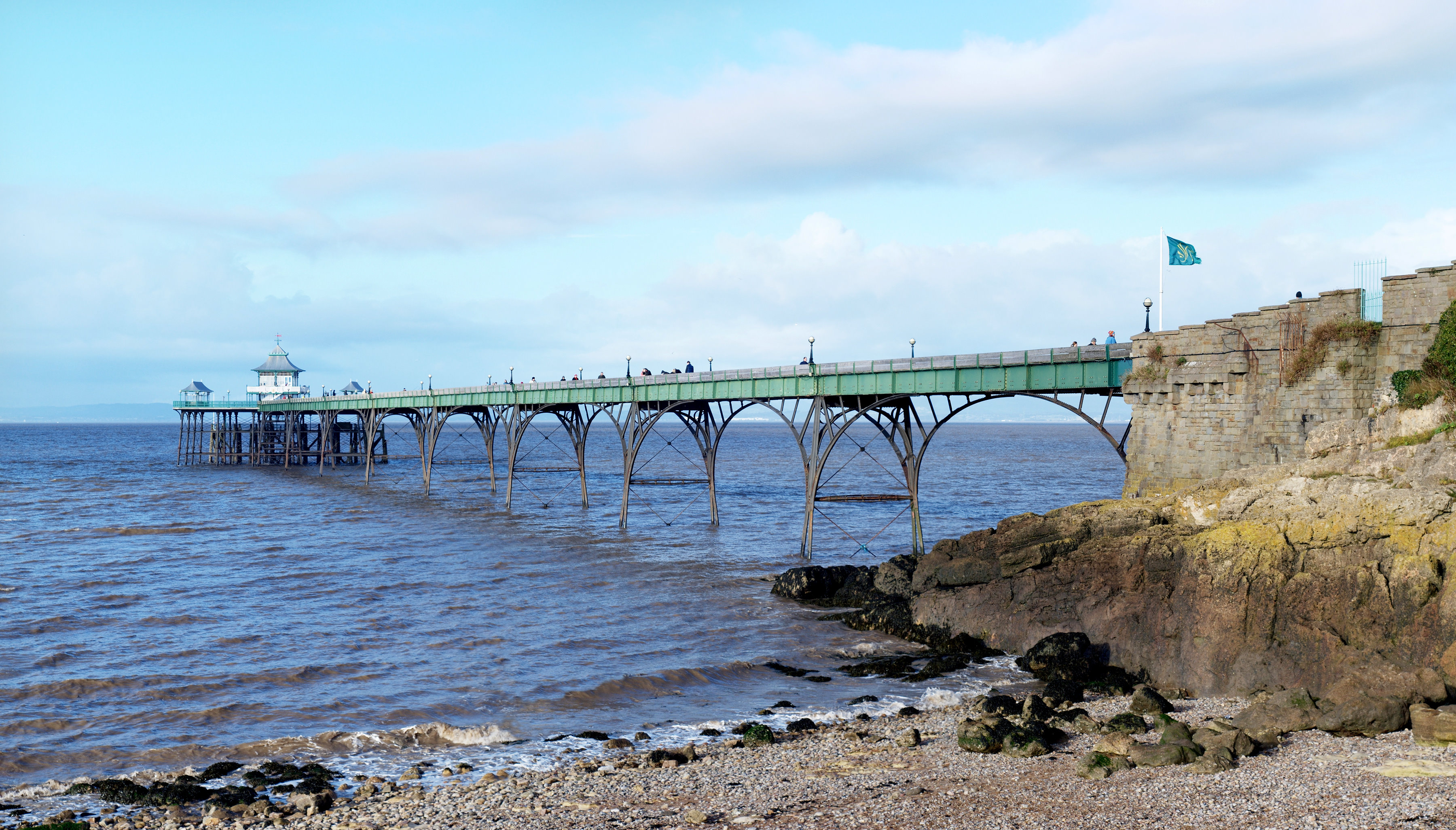
Clevedon Pier, England, 1869, cast iron base structure

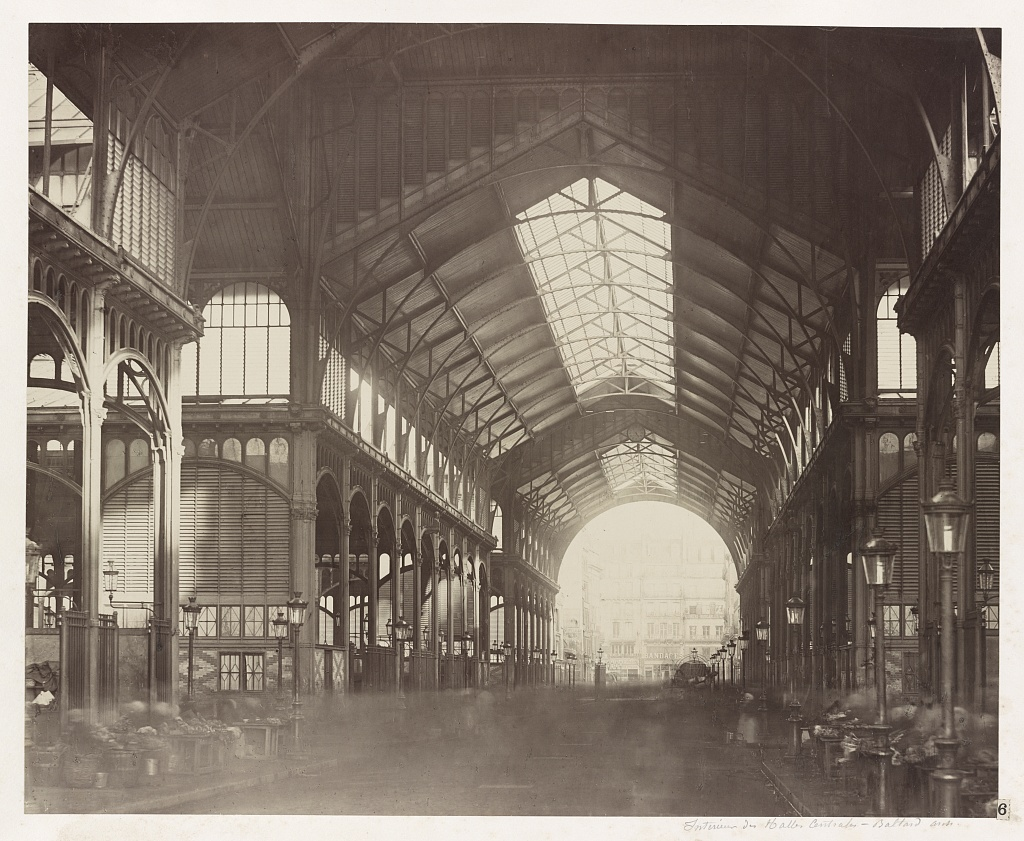
Les Halles, Paris, 1870s (demolished)

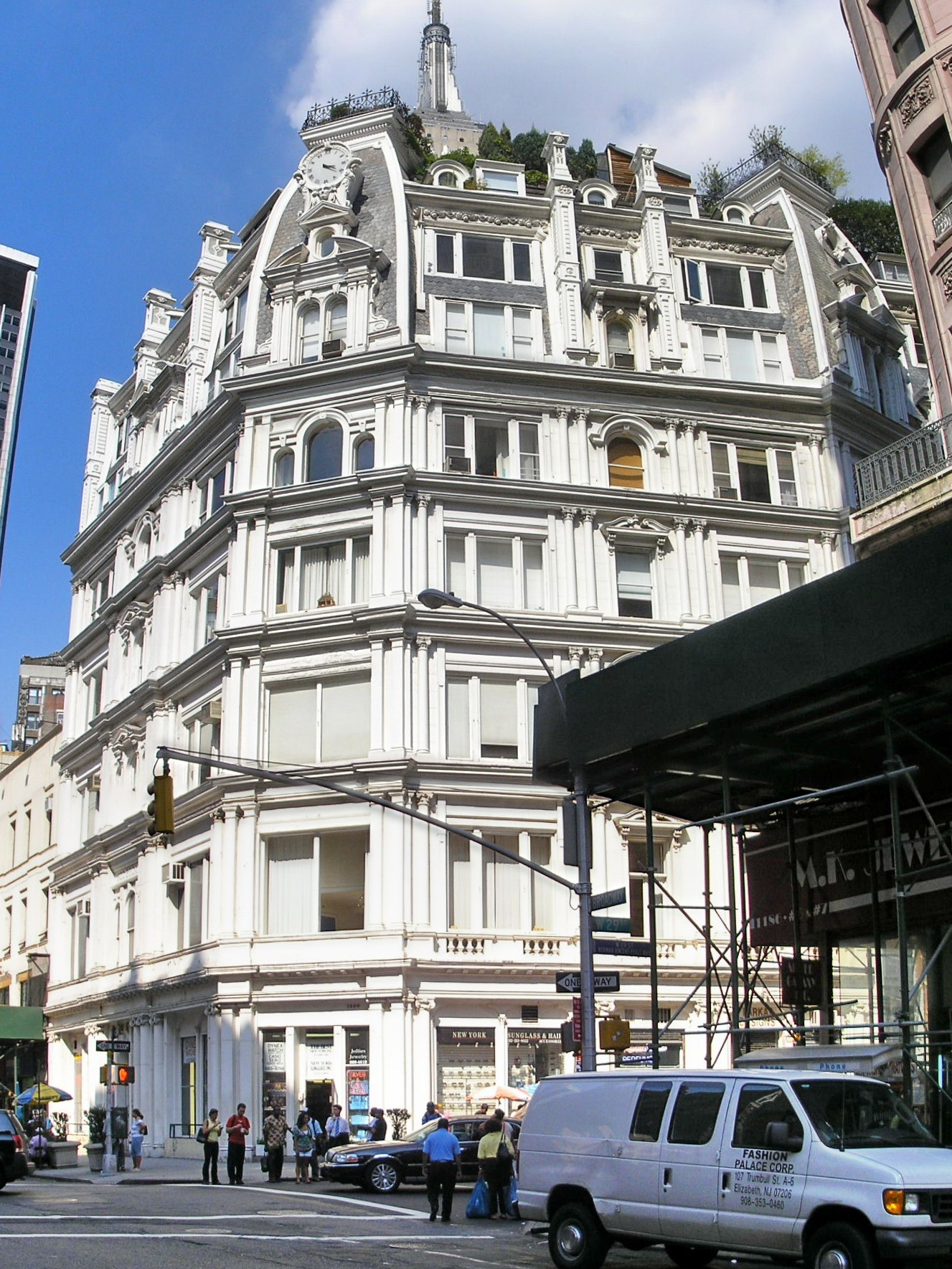
Gilsey House Hotel, New York, 1871

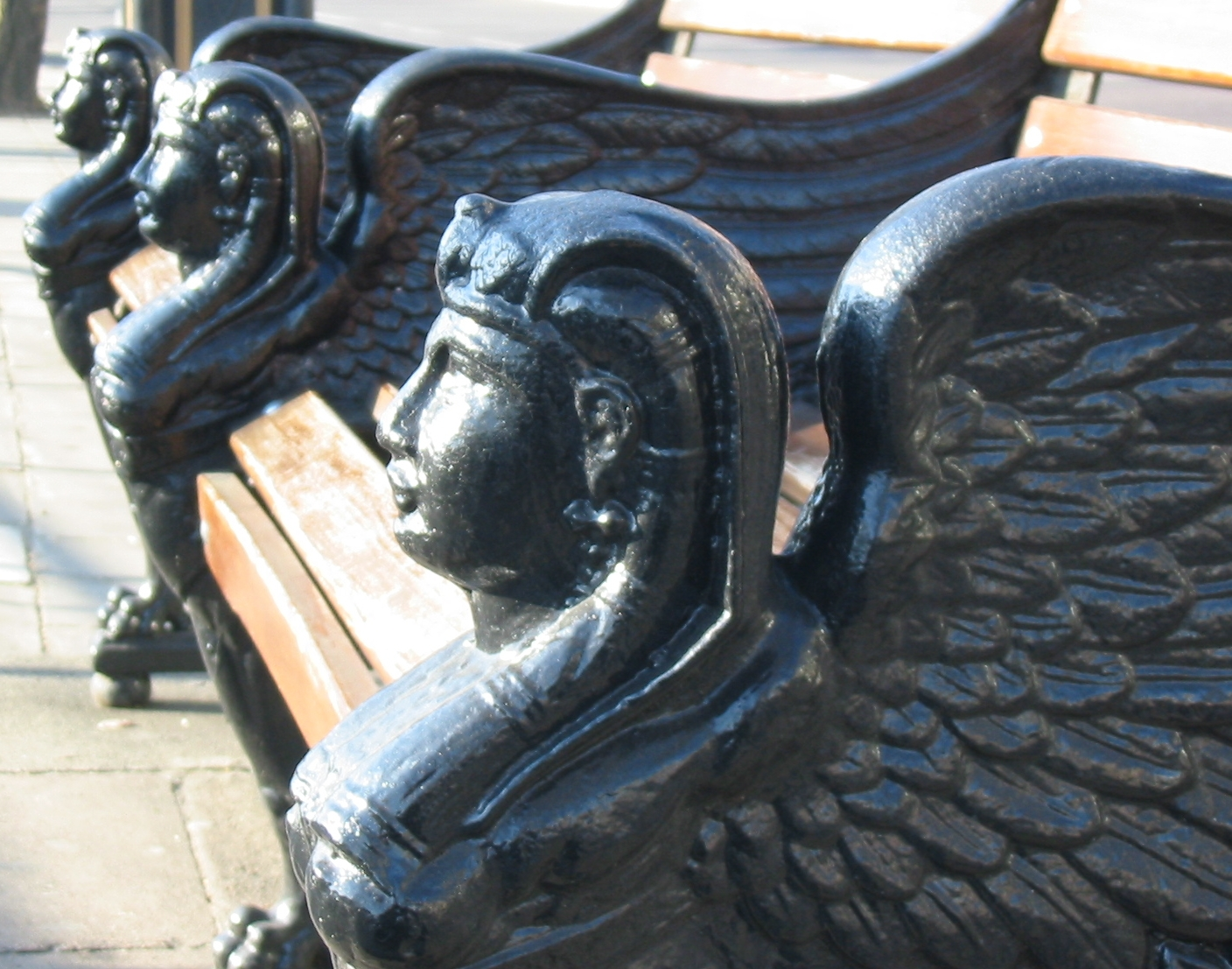
Sphinx bench, Victoria Embankment, London, 1877

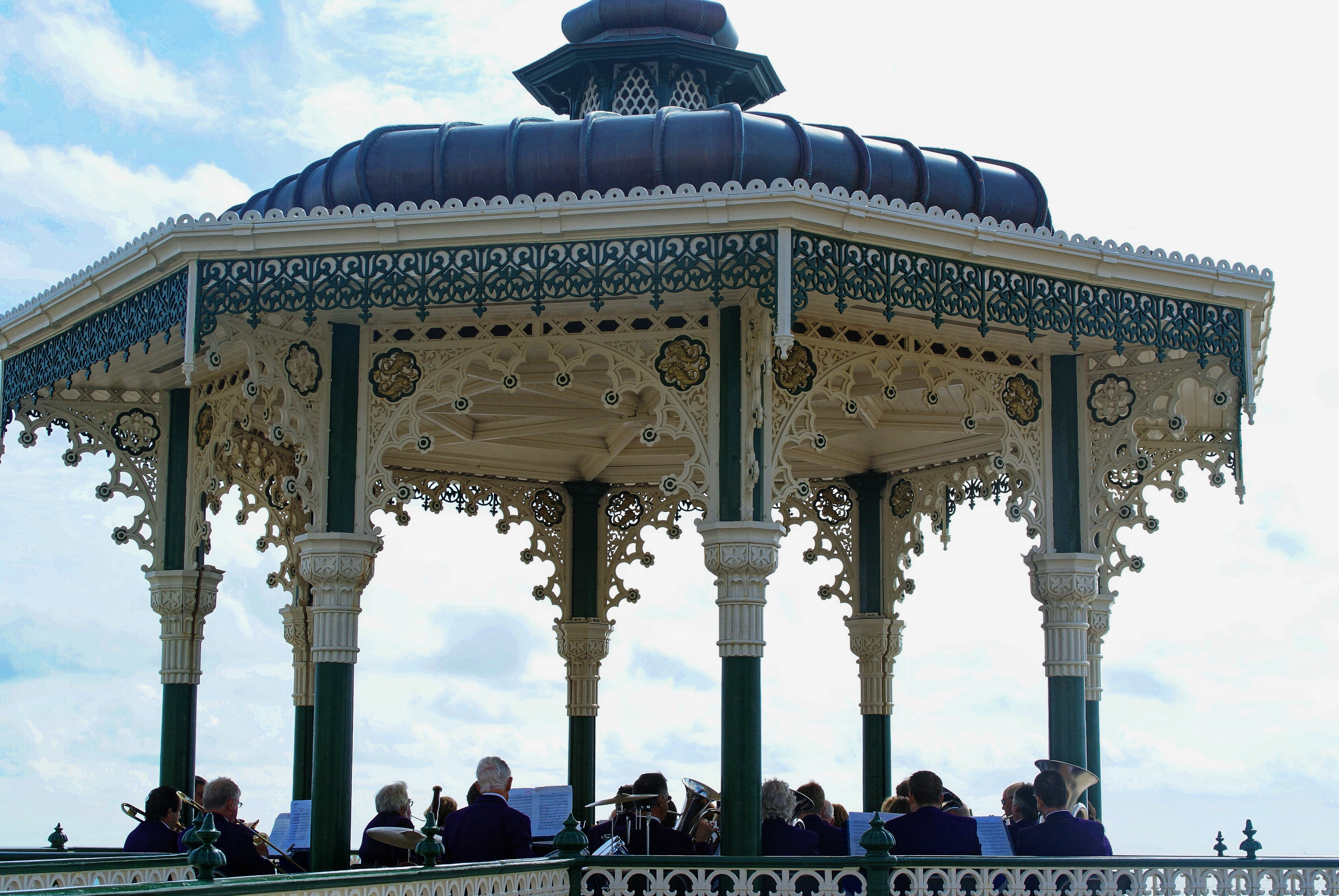
Brighton Beach Bandstand, Brighton UK, 1884

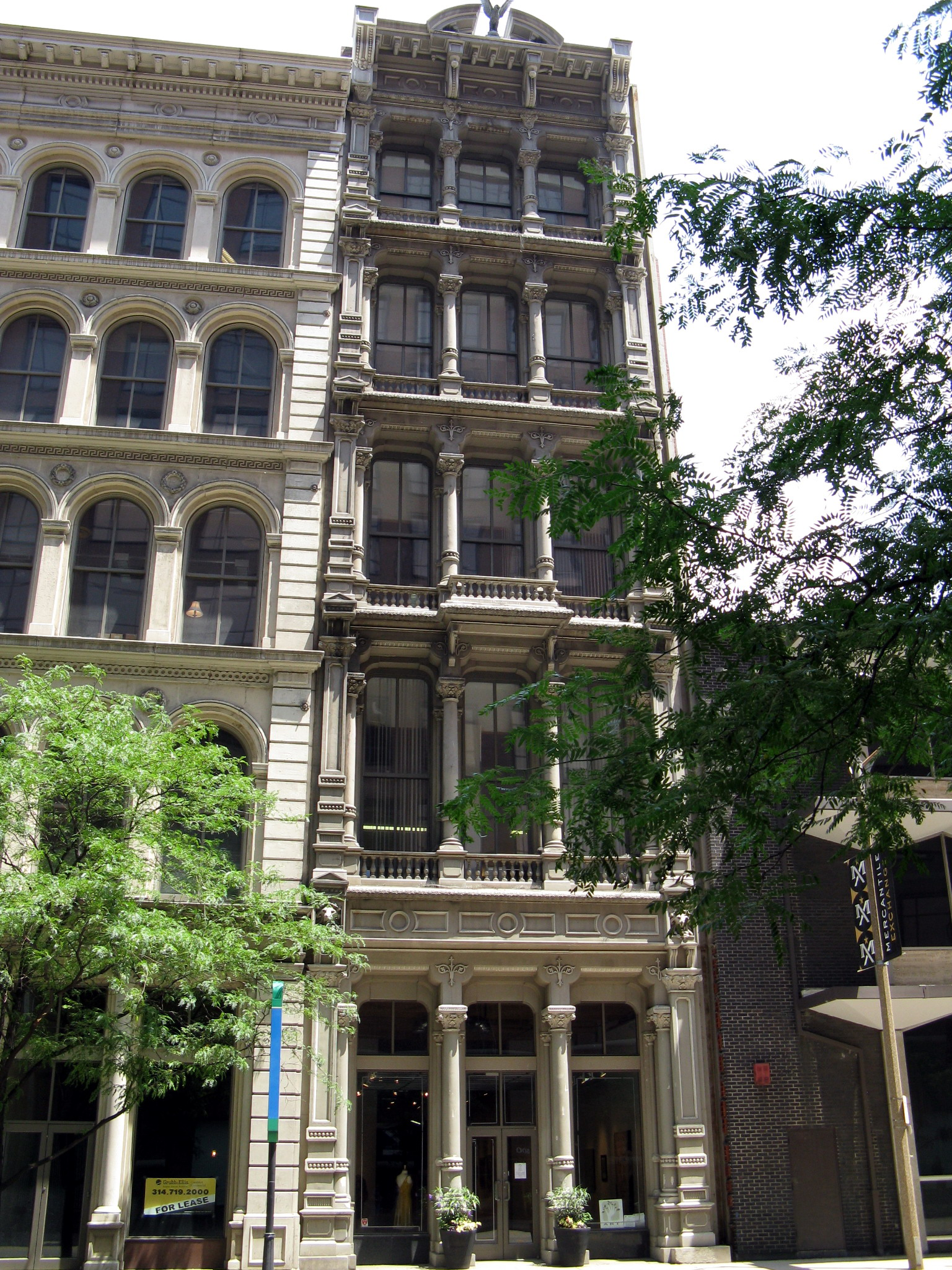
Cast Iron building St Louis, Missouri

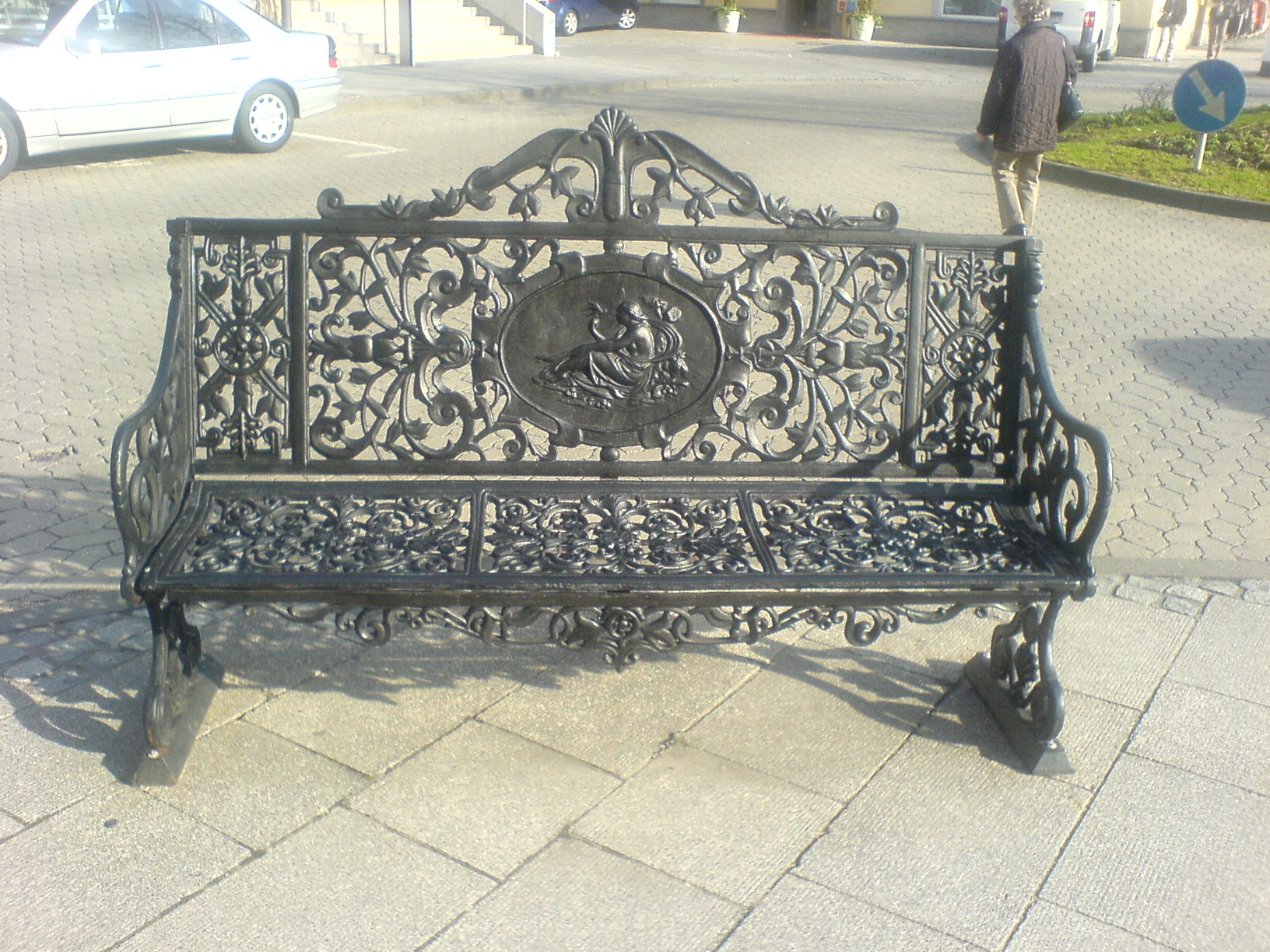
Old cast-iron bench, Bad Kissingen, Germany

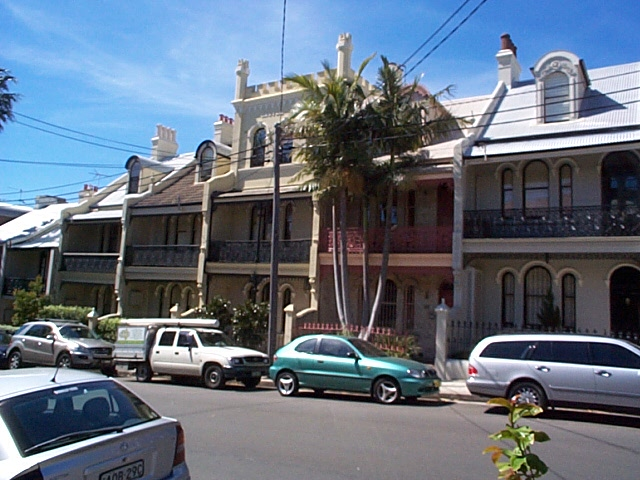
Typical Sydney iron lace terrace houses in Woollahra, New South Wales, late 19th century

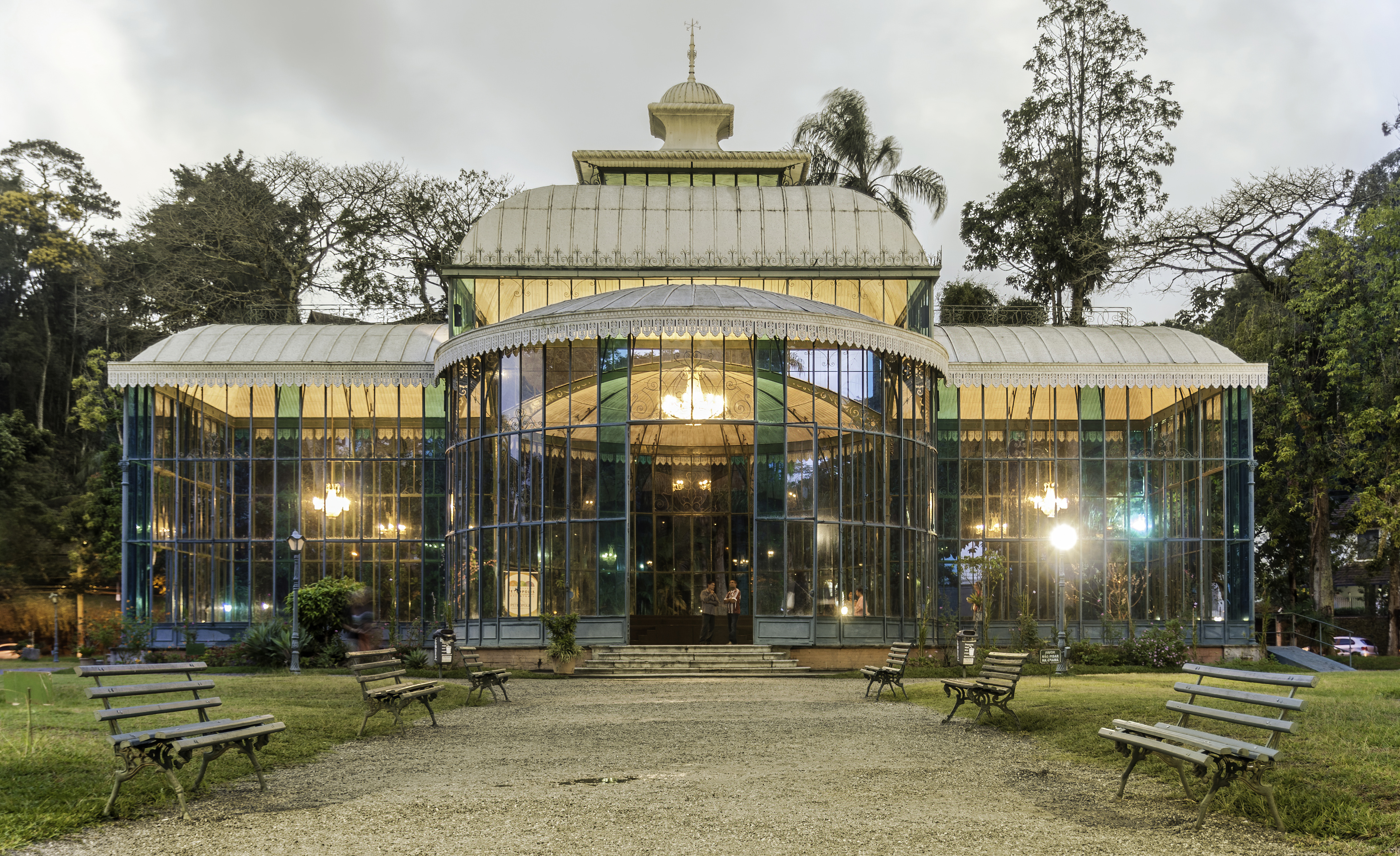
Crystal Palace, in Petropolis, Brazil, 1884

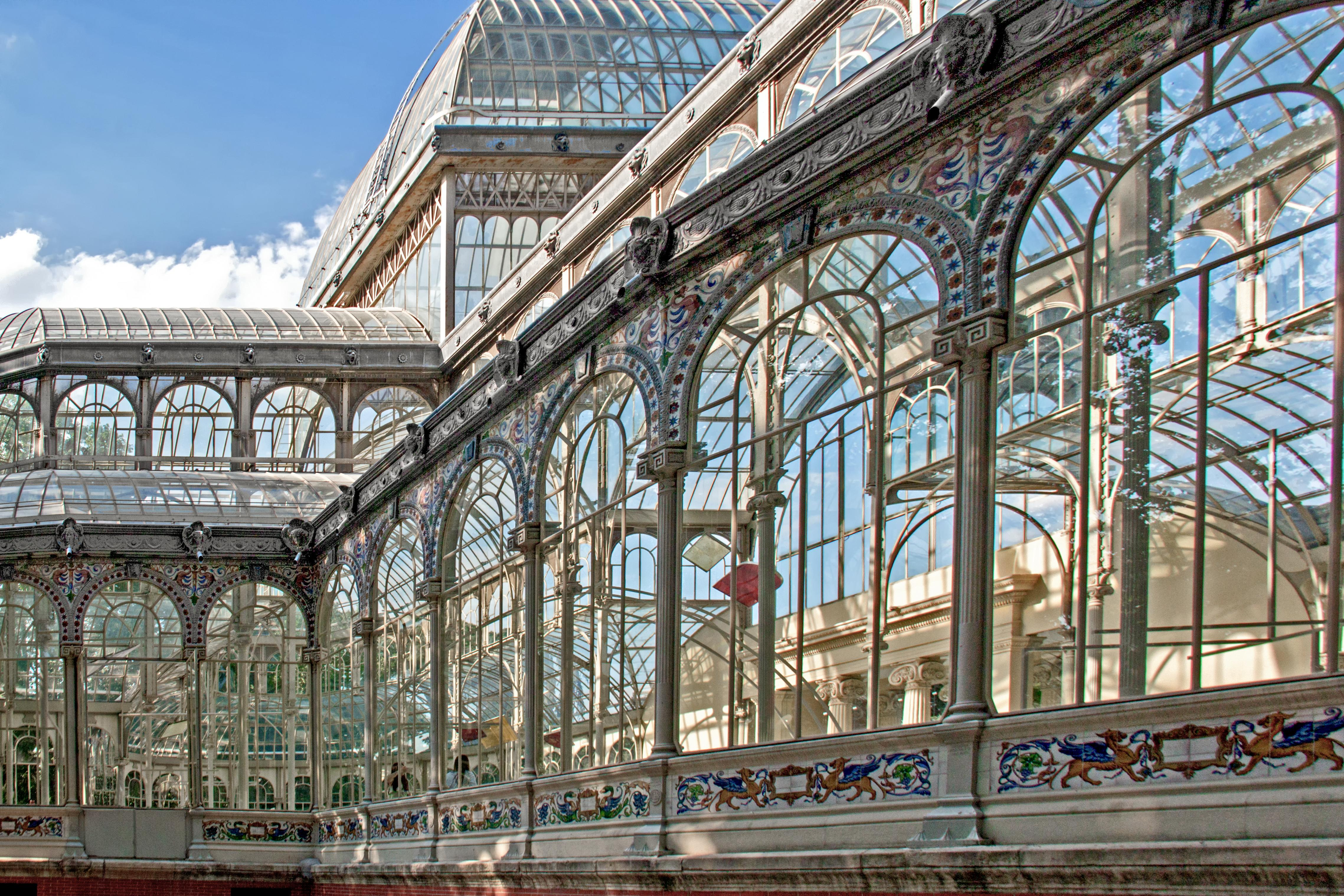
Palacio de Cristal del Retiro, in Madrid, Spain, 1887

Chilean Pavilion, in Santiago, Chile, 1889

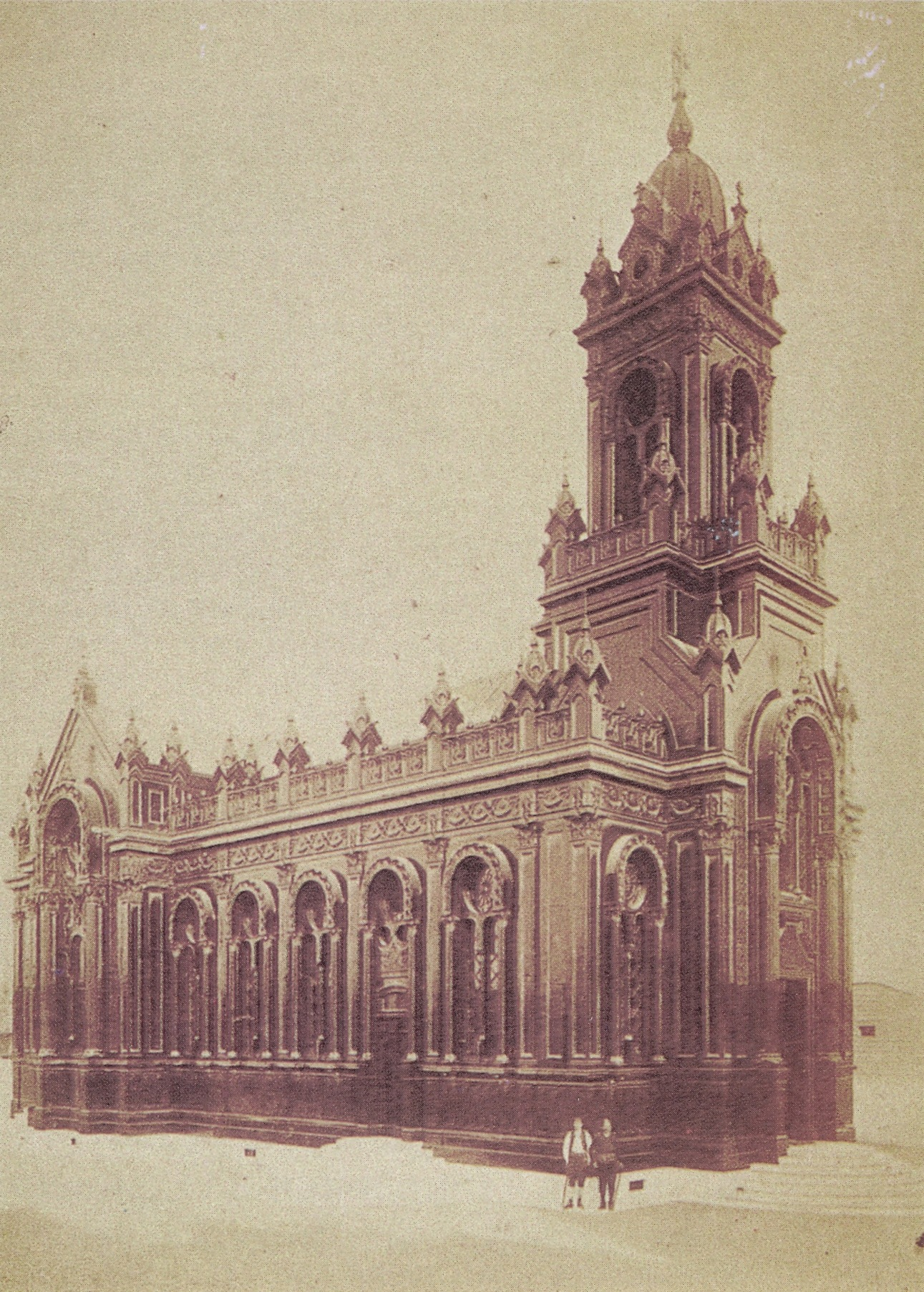
St Stephen's Bulgarian Church, Istanbul, 1898

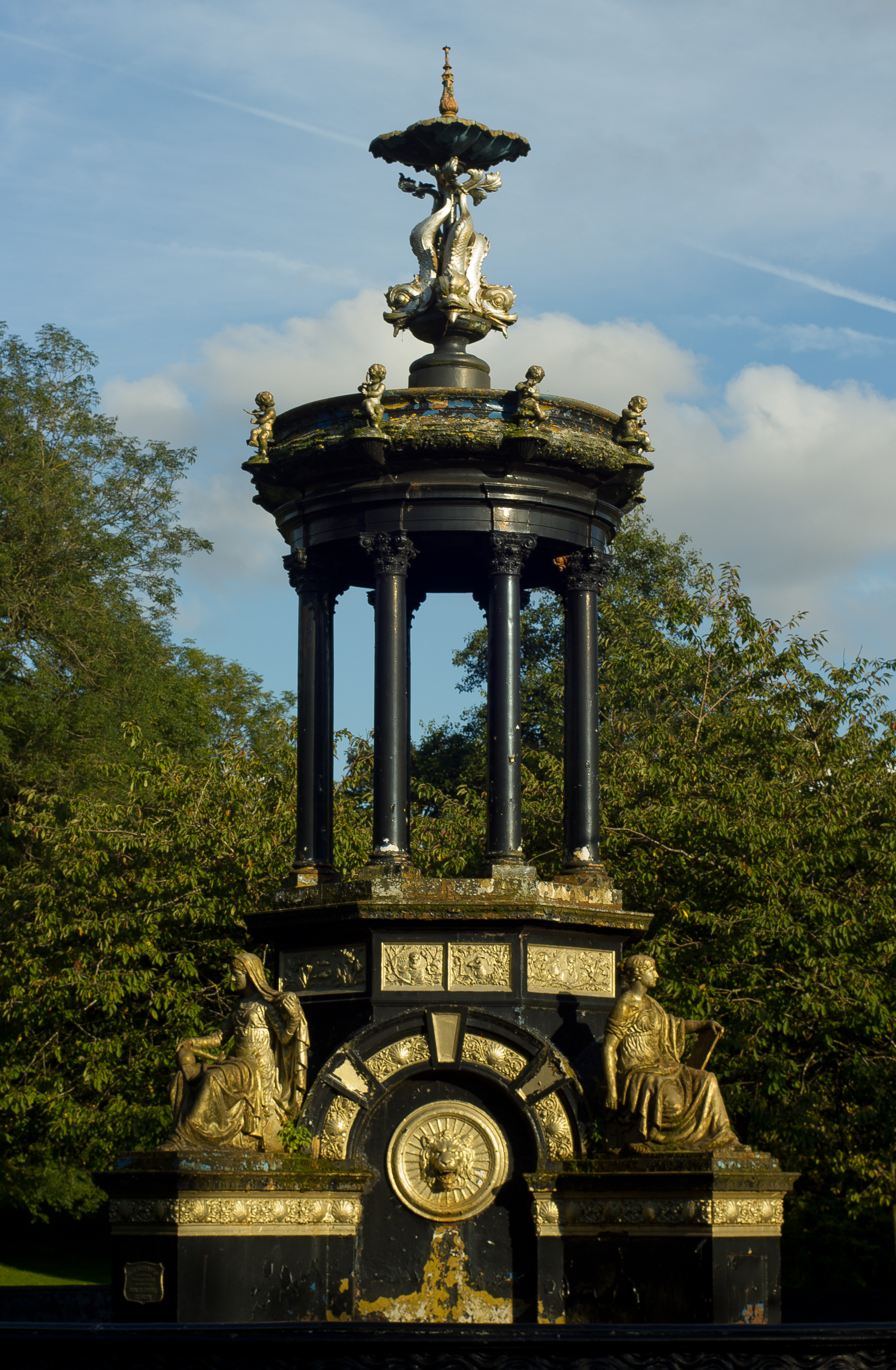
Cast iron fountain, Alexandra Park, Glasgow, 1901

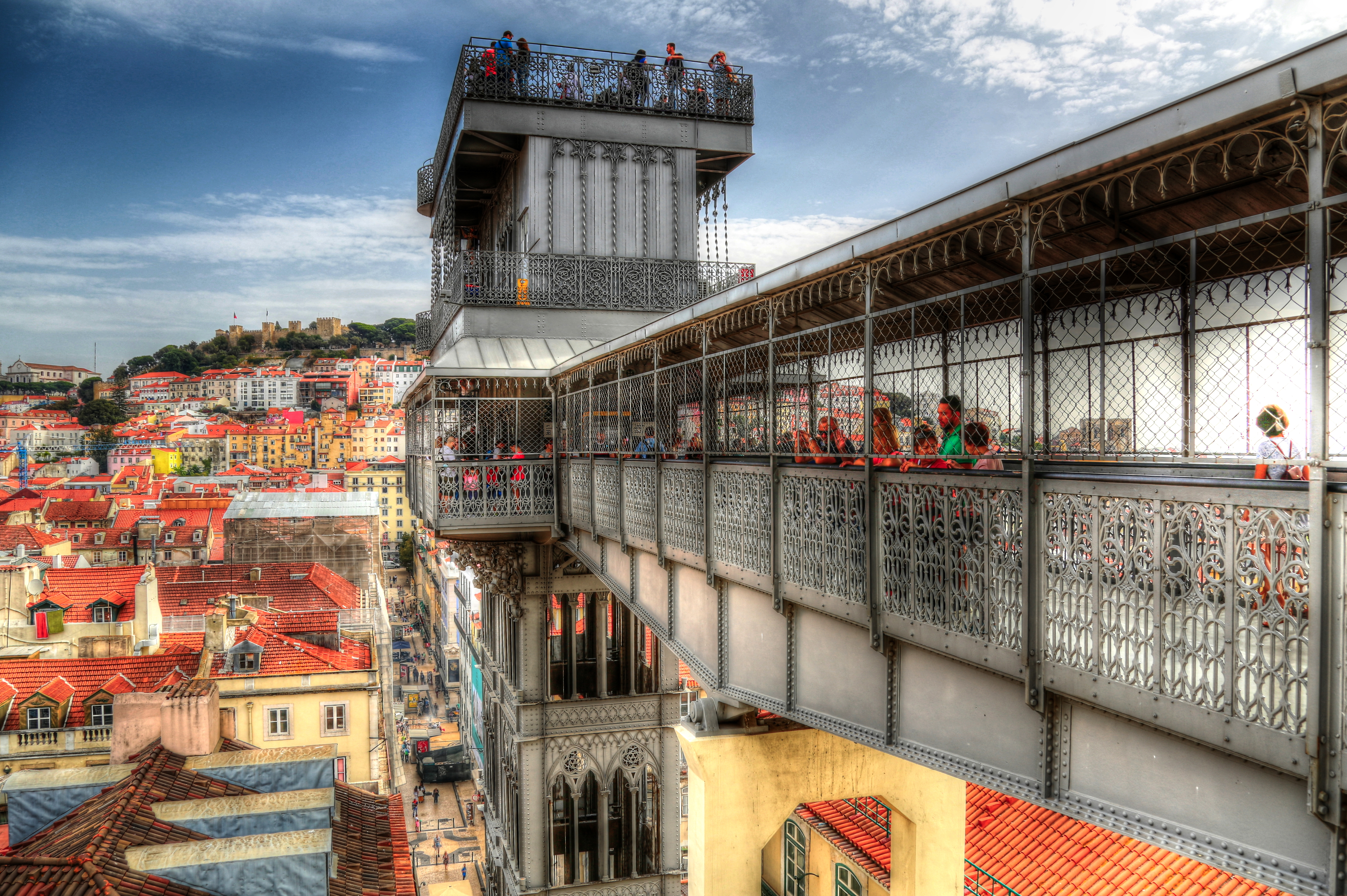
Santa Justa Lift, in Lisbon, Portugal, 1901

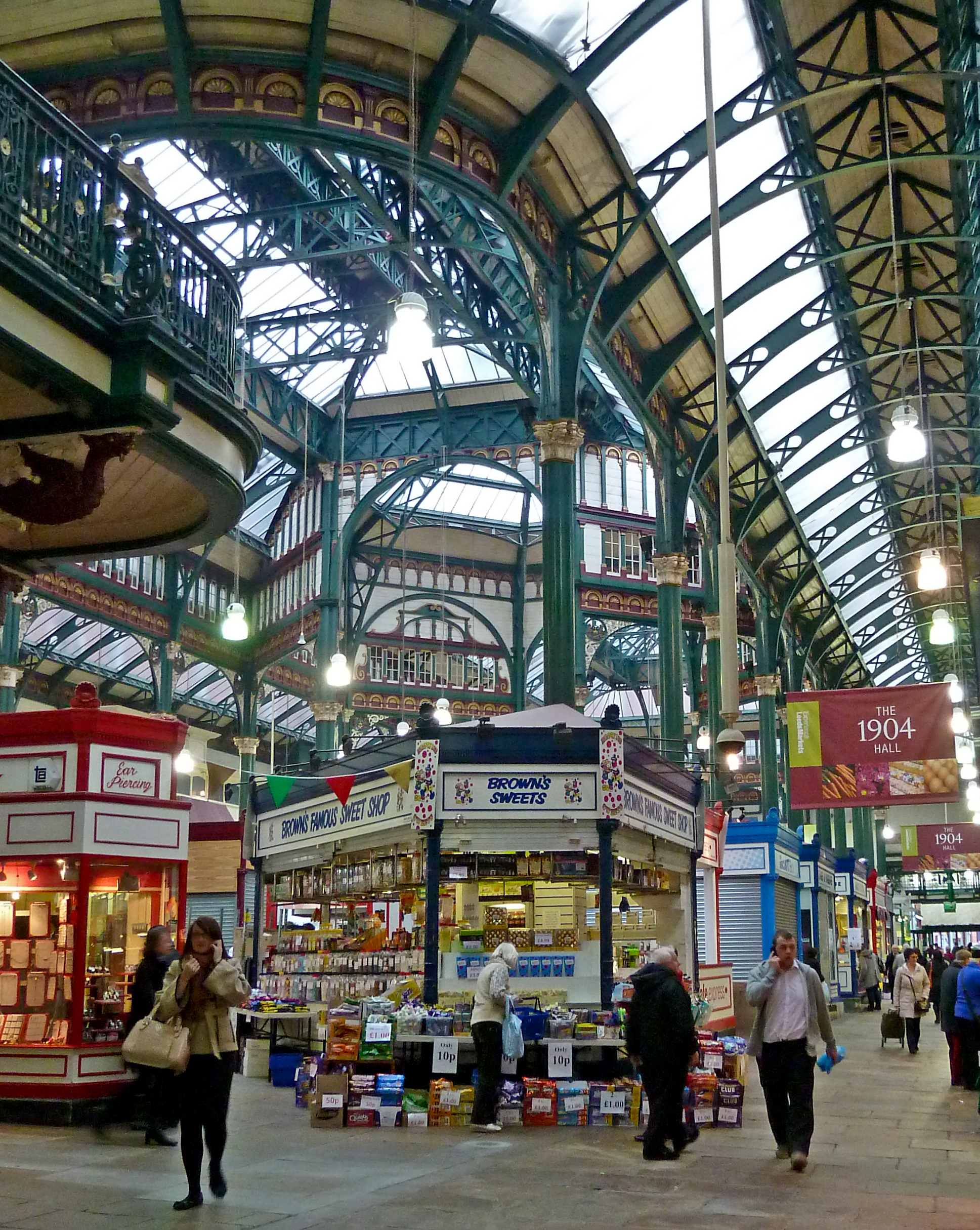
Hall of Kirkgate Market, Leeds, England, 1904

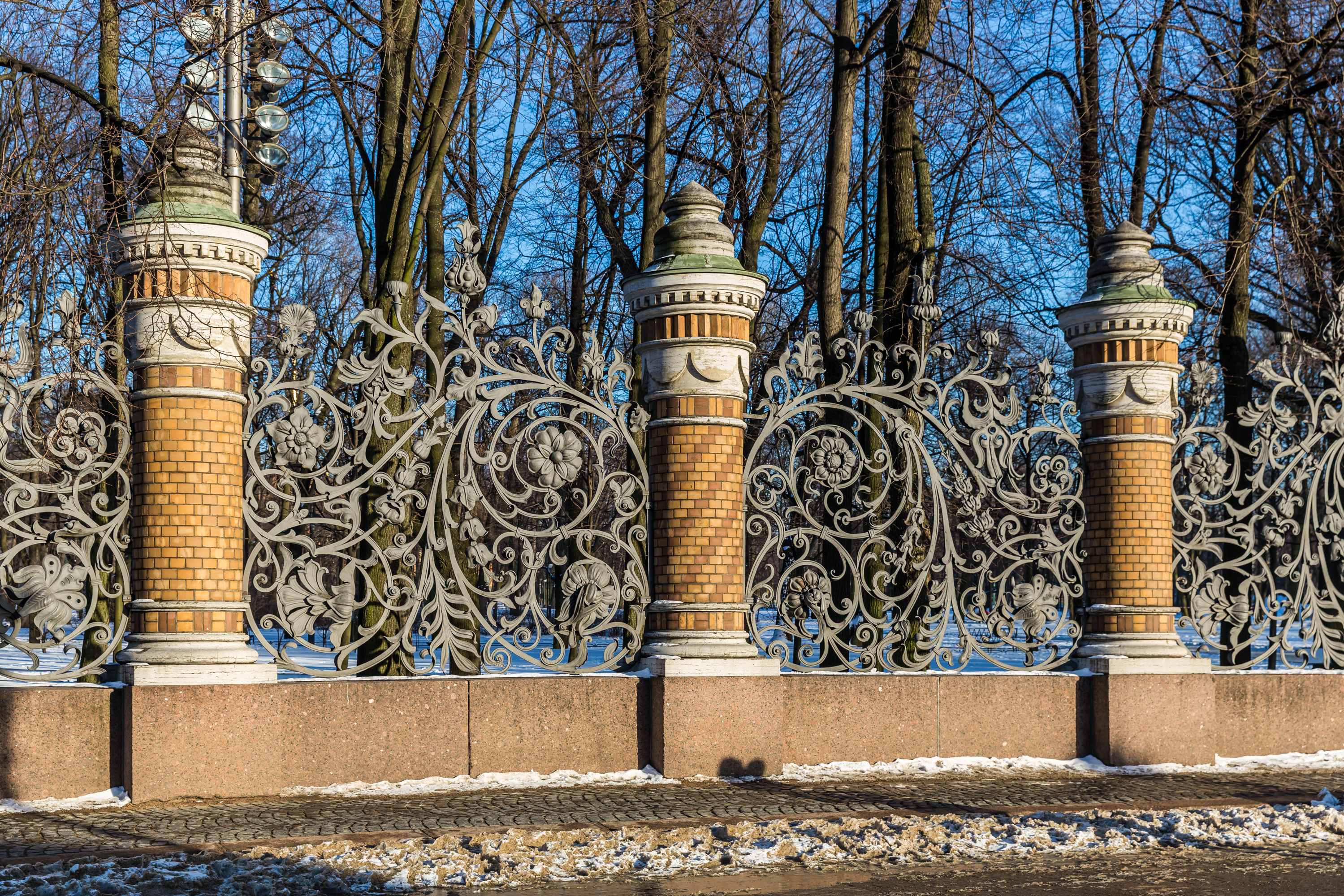
Mikhailovsky Garden fence, St Petersburg, 1907

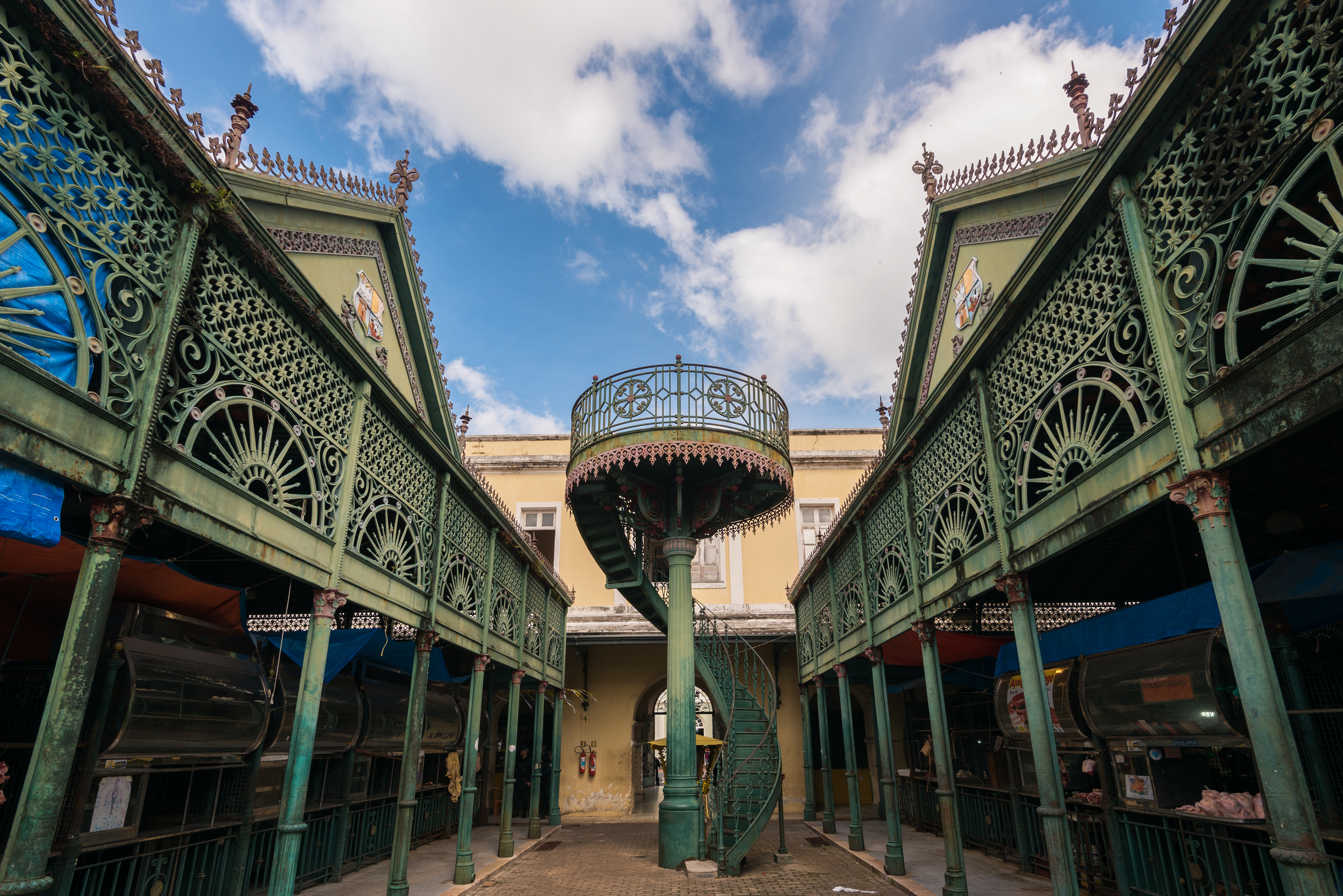
Meat Market, in Belém of Pará, Brazil, 1908

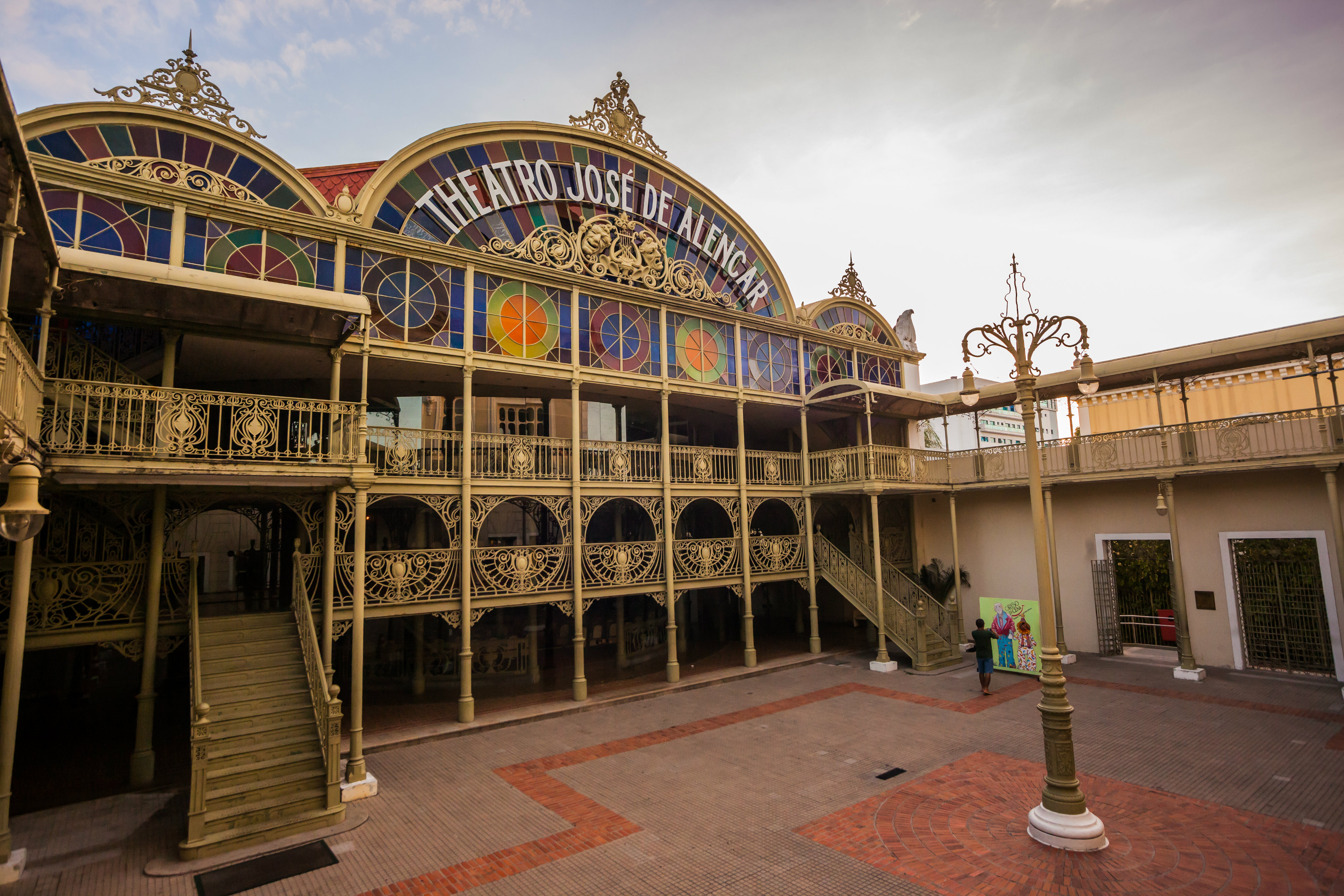
Theatro José de Alencar, in Fortaleza, Brazil, 1910

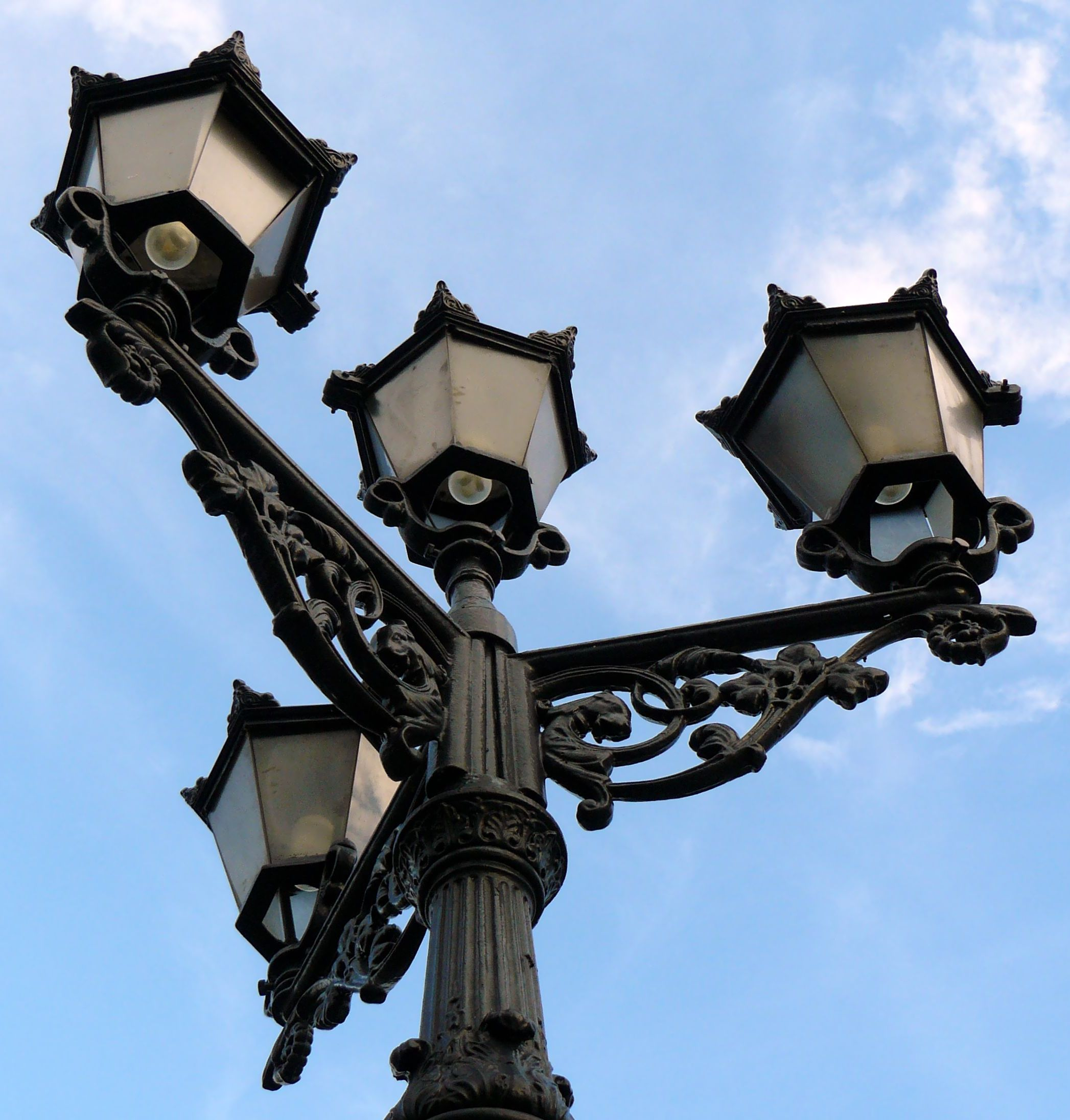
Lamps on Elgin Bridge (Singapore), 1929
