= Alanna Heiss =

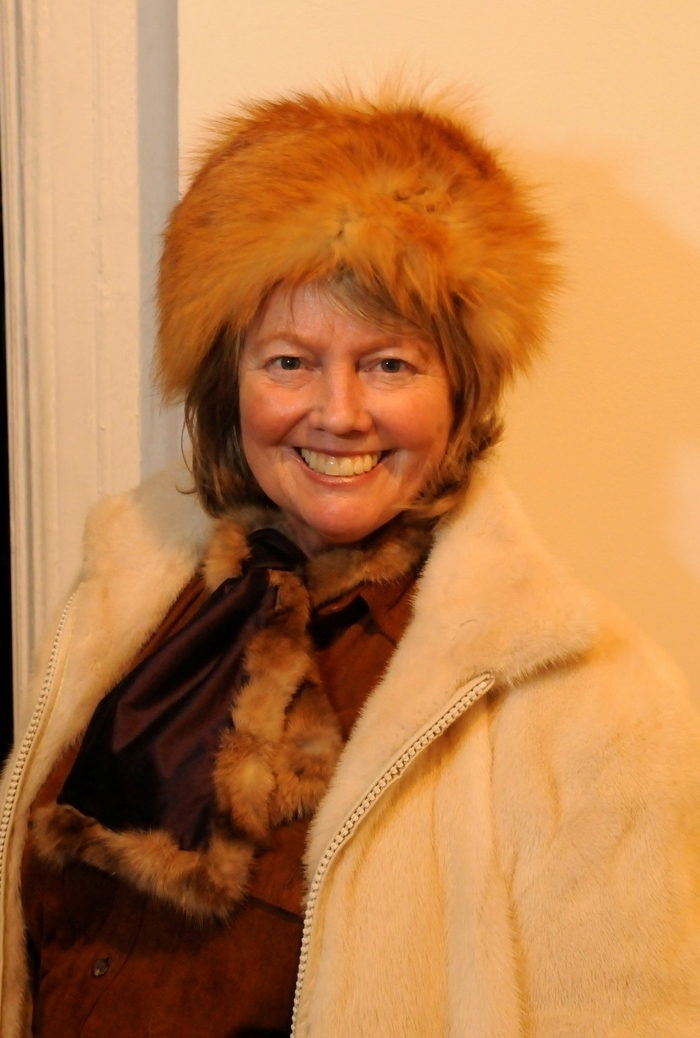
- Alanna Heiss at P.S.1 Contemporary Art Center opening on February 22, 2009
- Born: May 13, 1943 (age 82); Louisville, Kentucky
- Known for: Art International Radio, Clocktower Productions, alternative space movement, P.S.1 Contemporary Art Center,

Alanna Heiss (born May 13, 1943, in Louisville, Kentucky) is the Founder and Director of Clocktower Productions, a non profit arts organization, online radio station, and program partnership with six cultural institutions in three boroughs in New York. She founded The Institute for Art and Urban Resources, Inc. in 1971, an organization focused on using abandoned and underutilized New York City buildings for art exhibitions and artists' studios, of which P.S.1 was a part. She served as the director of P.S.1 and its later incarnation, the P.S.1 Contemporary Art Center (now MoMA PS1) from its founding in 1976 until her retirement in 2008. She is recognized as one of the originators of the alternative space movement.

Heiss has curated and/or organized over 700 exhibitions at P.S.1 and elsewhere. She was interviewed for the film !Women Art Revolution.

== Early life and education ==
Heiss was born in Louisville, Kentucky, and raised in the farming community of Jacksonville, Illinois. The daughter of teachers, she graduated with a B.A. from Lawrence University in Appleton, Wisconsin, which she attended on a scholarship from the Lawrence Conservatory of Music.

== Alternative Spaces Movement ==
In the early 1970s, Heiss became a leader of the Alternative Spaces Movement, which turned abandoned or under-utilized buildings in New York City into temporary centers for the production and presentation of contemporary art. These projects across the city were grouped under the umbrella organization The Institute for Art and Urban Resources, which operated as many as 11 spaces in the early to mid 1970s, including the Idea Warehouse, 10 Bleecker Street, and The Coney Island Factory.

The institute's first major project was the 1971 Under The Brooklyn Bridge event, which presented seminal projects by such artists as Carl Andre, Keith Sonnier, Gordon Matta-Clark, Jene Highstein, Sol LeWitt, Richard Nonas, and Dennis Oppenheim, among others.

== The Clocktower Gallery ==
In 1972, Heiss founded The Clocktower Gallery, an art space housed in the former New York Life Insurance Company Building, a landmarked McKim, Mead & White municipal building known as the Clocktower, in Lower Manhattan.

Opening with inaugural shows by Joel Shapiro, Richard Tuttle, and James Bishop, the Clocktower presented seminal work in the visual arts, performance, and music by artists including Gordon Matta-Clark, Lynda Benglis, Max Neuhaus, Dennis Oppenheim, Richard Artschwager, Pat Steir, Vito Acconci, Michelangelo Pistoletto, Charlotte Moorman, Laurie Anderson, and Marina Abramović, Jennifer Bartlett, among others. In 2013, the City of New York sold the Clocktower building to a private developer, and the organization relocated its operations through program partnerships with other arts institutions around the city, including Pioneer Works in Red Hook, Knockdown Center in Queens, and Times Square Arts, among others.

== P.S.1 Contemporary Art Center ==
In 1976, Heiss founded P.S.1 Contemporary Art Center (now MoMA PS1), an institution dedicated to contemporary art housed in a Romanesque-revival school building in Long Island City, Queens, New York. The museum opened in June 1976 with the inaugural "Rooms" exhibit, for which Heiss invited a great number of artists - many of whom experimented with such new forms as video, installation, and performance art - to install their work throughout the building. Richard Serra, Walter De Maria, Lynn Hershman Leeson, John Baldessari, Bruce Nauman, Robert Ryman, Jennifer Bartlett, Vito Acconci, Daniel Buren, Lawrence Weiner, Max Neuhaus, Nam June Paik, Marcia Hafif, were among the artists to participate in this exhibition, which articulated much of the ideals and conceptualizations of installation art and has since become emblematic of the alternative spaces movement.

Artist Richard Nonas later remarked that "Alanna is probably the most important single figure in that effluence of another kind of art-making or art-doing in New York in the seventies — not only the art itself but also the way the art existed in the city."

Over the next three decades, P.S.1 became one of the most respected exhibition and performance spaces in New York, with such exhibitions as New York, New Wave (1981); Stalin's Choice: Soviet Socialist Realism, 1932–1956 (1993); Greater New York (2000 and 2005), and Arctic Hysteria (2008); Robert Grosvenor (1976); Keith Sonnier (1983); Alex Katz: Under the Stars, American Landscapes 1951–1995 (1998); John Wesley: Paintings 1961–2000 (2000), and Gino De Dominicis (2008). Rooms were also used as artists' studios.

In 2000, the organization became affiliated with The Museum of Modern Art, giving it greater financial stability, extending the reach of both institutions, and combining P.S.1's contemporary mission with MoMA's strength as one of the greatest collecting museums of modern art. The deal allowed MoMA, after a seven-year period, to take command of P.S.1's financial management and the appointment of its board members. In 2008, shortly after this seven-year period, Heiss left P.S.1 to create AIR, Art International Radio.

== AIR, Art International Radio ==
In 2004, Heiss founded Art Radio WPS1.org, the Internet radio station of P.S.1; it was later discontinued on January 1, 2009. When she left P.S.1 in 2008, Heiss founded Art International Radio, which is unaffiliated with P.S.1, yet houses in its online archive programs that originally aired on WPS1. AIR produces its own arts-oriented material and is home to the Clocktower Gallery.

In December 2013, after 40 years of operation from its historic 1894 McKim, Mead & White building in Lower Manhattan, the Clocktower announced the final exhibition in this legendary space, and plans for relocation through a year of creative collaborations with partner organizations all over New York City.

== Awards ==
Heiss has received the Mayor's Award for Contributions to the Artistic Viability of New York City, as well as France's prestigious Chevalier des Arts et des Lettres in the Légion d'Honneur. She has been decorated by the Order of the Polar Star for her contributions to the promotion of the arts in Sweden, and is a recipient of the Skowhegan Award for outstanding work in the arts. She was honored in 2008 with the Women of Distinction Award by the Girl Scout Council of Greater New York, and was recognized as New York's 100 Most Influential Women by Crain's New York Business. In 2007, Heiss received the CCS Bard Award for Curatorial Excellence. In 2001, Heiss received an Honorary Doctorate in Fine Arts from the San Francisco Art Institute, and in 2008 she received an Honorary Doctorate in Humane Letters from Lawrence University.

== Notes ==
- Anon (2018). "Artist, Curator & Critic Interviews". !Women Art Revolution - Spotlight at Stanford. Archived from the original on March 26, 2018.
