= Art International Radio =

Coordinates: 40.71669°N 74.00431°W

Art International Radio was an online, non-profit, cultural Internet radio station and home to the Clocktower Gallery, a historic New York City alternative exhibition space. Art International Radio was directed by Alanna Heiss, the founder and former Director of P.S.1 Contemporary Art Center in Long Island City, Queens.

== Mission and operation ==
Art International Radio was launched as AIR on January 1, 2009. The non-profit AIR is licensed by the New York City Department of Cultural Affairs in the Clocktower Gallery spaces, which AIR Director Alanna Heiss has occupied since 1972. In December 2013, after 40 years of operation from its building in Lower Manhattan, the Clocktower Gallery announced its final exhibition and plans for relocation through a year of creative collaborations with partner organizations in New York City.

AIR's programming is archived online. Programs include new music, spoken word, theater and discussions recorded both in-studio and offsite from art events worldwide such as Art Basel Miami Beach and the Venice Biennale. AIR also engaged in organizational collaborations by recording, editing and archiving public programs from various cultural groups, galleries, museums, and performing art centers.

As an extension to the radio project, gallery spaces were used for artists’ projects, workshops, community events, and as residences. In June 2010, the second exhibition at AIR's Clocktower Gallery opened; entitled The Dangerous Book Four Boys. It was the first solo exhibition of the work of actor and artist James Franco.

== Clocktower Gallery ==
Alanna Heiss founded The Institute for Art and Urban Resources in 1971, which was devoted to creating installations in otherwise unused or overlooked spaces in New York. The Institute's debut exhibition, Under the Brooklyn Bridge, featured artists such as Carl Andre, Philip Glass, and Sol LeWitt, and was organized by Heiss with the help of the Post-Minimalist sculptor Gordon Matta Clark. In 1972, with the backing of The Institute, she created the Clocktower Gallery, located in the McKim, Mead & White building on Leonard Street and Broadway in Lower Manhattan, New York.

After the September 11th Terrorist Attacks, security procedures in this city-owned building suspended ongoing activity and exhibitions in the Clocktower Gallery. In 2004, the space became the headquarters of P.S.1 Contemporary Art Center’s Web radio station, Art Radio WPS1.org.

== Building history ==
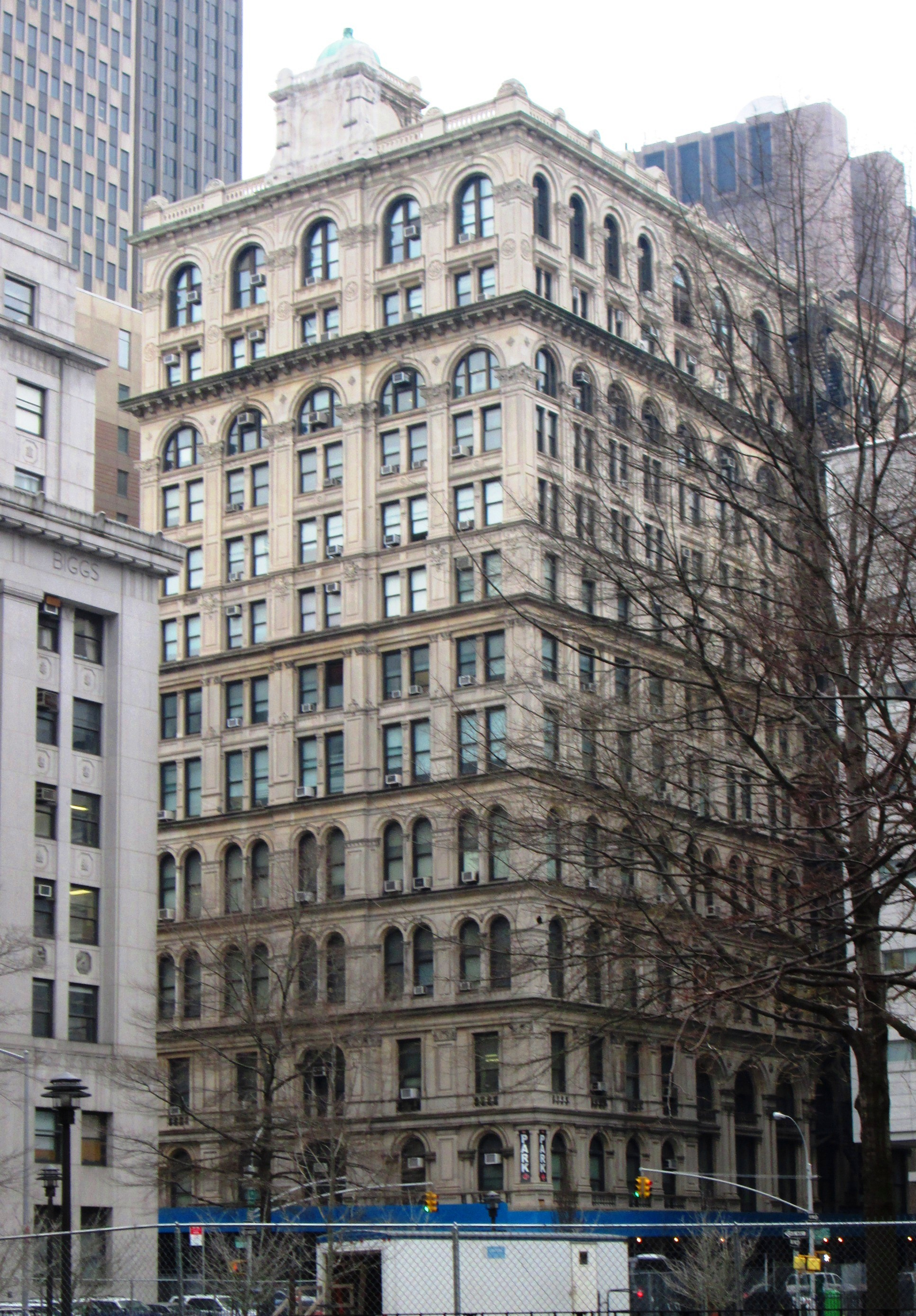
Building, from east

See 108 Leonard

The Clock Tower Office Building, formerly known as the New York Life Insurance Company Building, was constructed 1894–1898. New York City bought it in 1967 and moved the New York City Criminal Court Summons into the building. The building retains many of New York Life's original interior spaces, including a marble lobby, a 13-story stair hall, a banking hall, executive offices, and the clock tower machinery room.

The Clock Tower Building is a designated New York City Landmark, and is a part of the New York State and National Registers of Historic Places.
