= Appleton Building =

Building in Manhattan, New York (destroyed 1867)

Coordinates: 40°42′59.7″N 74°0′14.2″W

The Appleton Building occupied the front of a small block which was bounded by Broadway, Leonard Street, and Catharine Alley in New York City. It stood on the site of what is now 346 Broadway, was four stories tall, and was constructed entirely of brown stone. It was a familiar landmark in a quickly changing Broadway of the mid-19th century. It was one of Broadway's oldest buildings.

== History ==
The Appletons were publishers who left the address for offices at a marble store located at 343 and 345 Broadway, in April 1860. Afterward the Appleton Building underwent considerable alterations prior to welcoming its new tenants, Graybon, McCreary, & Co., dry goods merchants. They leased the entire establishment after relocating from Park Place. The firm occupied the entire ground floor and basement for their own business.

The building was the home of S.B. Chittenden & Company, wholesale dealers and importers of dry goods of all types. It was owned by Messrs. Appleton & Company and valued at $250,000, at the time of its destruction. Appleton & Company took over its ownership after it was vacated by the Society Library. In March 1854 Geo. Carstensen and Chs. Gildemeister, architects, maintained their offices in the building. In January 1855 the firm of Foster, Dixon & Company was giving lessons in writing, mathematics, and bookkeeping at 346 Broadway. Men who answered their The New York Times advertisement would be quickly prepared for a career in the counting house. The New York Book Publishers' Association held a meeting at their Appleton Building offices on September 12, 1855. Its members attended with association Vice President, A.S. Barnes, presiding. C.C. Marsh, an accountant, advertised practice for bookkeeping and mercantile affairs at 348 Broadway in February 1857.

== Cartoons of Raphael ==
Charles B. Norton, a bibliographical agent at the Appleton Building, secured for sale in New York City, fine paper copies of a series of impressions of Raphael cartoons. These were obtained from the government plates at Hampton Court in December 1859. They measured 38 X 25 inches. Produced by Day & Son, engravers to Queen Victoria, a set of seven cartoons sold for $10 in New York.

== Destroyed by fire ==
The structure burned on February 12, 1867, during an intense fire which was discovered by an officer of the 6th precinct at 5:40 a.m. Within an hour's time, flames had engulfed the huge and isolated building. E.S. Jaffray & Company, a dry goods house, which occupied the building on the north side of Leonard Street, was engulfed by flames in its upper floors. Nearly all of its windows were burned but the flames were quickly extinguished. S.B. Chittenden sustained a loss estimated between $800,000 and $1 million. The business had only a few days prior rejected an offer of $100,000 to lease the Appleton Building. The structure was a total loss.

== See also ==
- Robbins & Appleton Building
