= 108 Leonard =

Residential building in Manhattan, New York

- Former New York Life Insurance Company Building; Clock Tower Building
- U.S. National Register of Historic Places
- New York State Register of Historic Places
- New York City Landmark
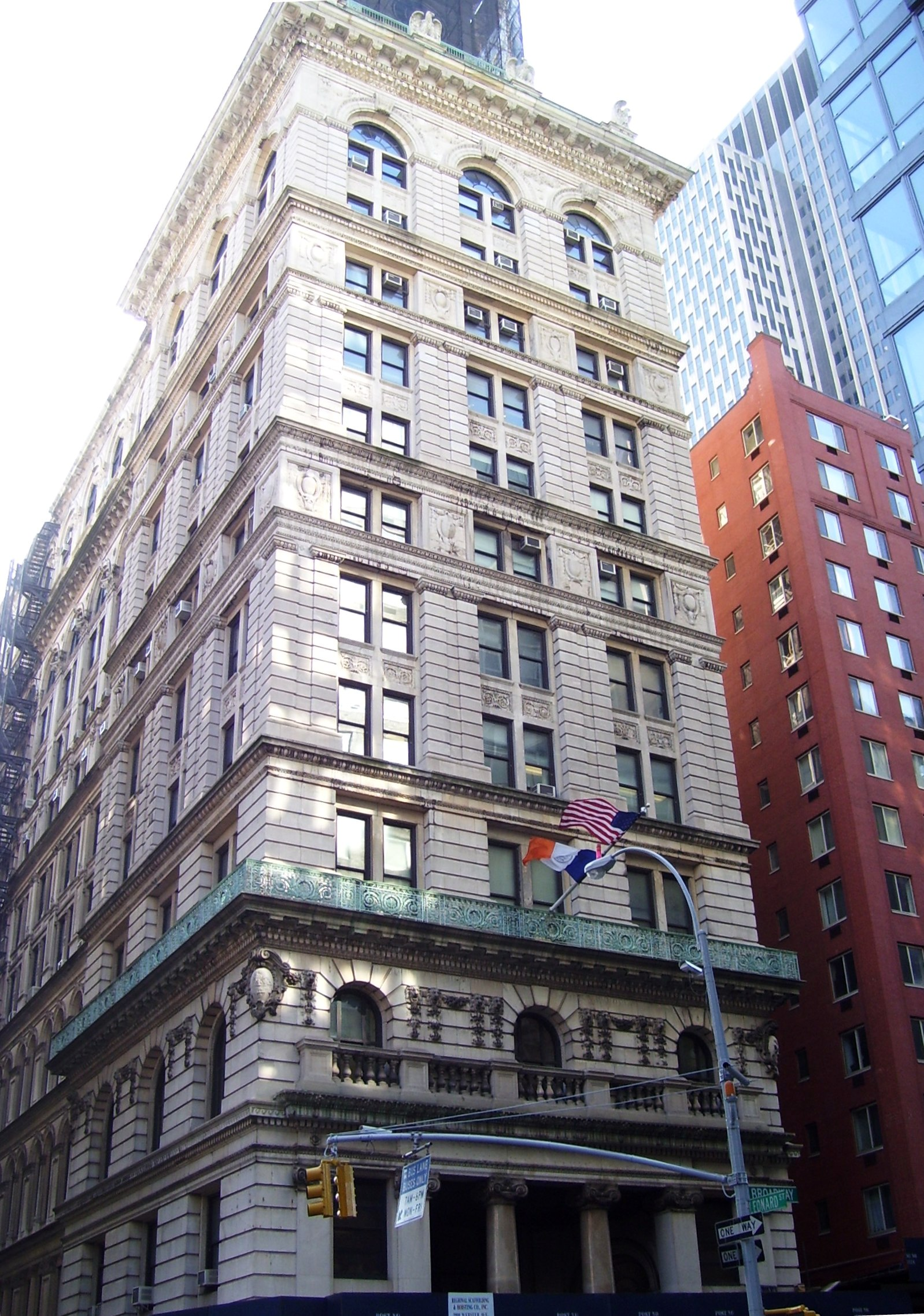
- The facade of the building as seen from the corner of Leonard Street and Broadway
- Location: 346 Broadway, Manhattan, New York, United States
- Coordinates: 40°42′59″N 74°00′12″W
- Built: 1894
- Architects: Stephen D. Hatch; McKim, Mead & White
- Architectural style: Late 19th and 20th Century Revivals
- NRHP reference No.: 82003376
- NYSRHP No.: 06101.001401
- NYCL No.: 1512, 1513

Significant dates
- Added to NRHP: June 28, 1982
- Designated NYSRHP: May 12, 1982
- Designated NYCL: February 10, 1987

108 Leonard (formerly known as 346 Broadway, the New York Life Insurance Company Building, and the Clock Tower Building) is a residential structure in the Tribeca neighborhood of Manhattan in New York City, New York, United States. Built from 1894 to 1898, the building was constructed for the New York Life Insurance Company. Stephen Decatur Hatch created the original plans while McKim, Mead & White oversaw the building's completion. The building occupies a city block bounded by Broadway to the west, Leonard Street to the north, Lafayette Street to the east, and Catherine Lane to the south. It is a New York City designated landmark and is listed on the National Register of Historic Places.

The exterior is largely made of marble, and each elevation of the facade is divided vertically into multiple bays. Although the main entrance is on Leonard Street, the western and eastern ends also contain entrances and are clad with rusticated stone blocks. On the upper stories, band courses run horizontally across the facade, and there are arched and rectangular windows. Along Broadway, above the 12th story, is an ornate clock tower, with a mechanically wound clock. A two-story penthouse is placed above the original roof. Inside the building are 152 condominium residences. The entrances lead to various lobbies, stairs, and hallways, some of which are elaborately decorated. In addition, there is a banquet hall within a former banking room near Lafayette Street; former executive offices on the lower floors; and residential amenities in the cellar and on the roof.

The present building at 346 Broadway was constructed in two phases, replacing a previous structure built in 1870. The eastern section was completed in 1896 as an annex of the previous building, while the western section was built in 1898 to replace the older building entirely. New York Life occupied the rebuilt edifice for three decades, moving to 51 Madison Avenue in 1928, although the firm continued to own the building until 1945. Clothing firms also rented space in the building during the early 20th century, and 346 Broadway hosted various U.S. federal and New York state government offices from the 1930s to the 1960s. After the government of New York City acquired the building in 1967, the structure housed the Summons Court and other judicial functions, as well as an art gallery. The Peebles Corporation and El-Ad Group bought the building for $160 million in 2013 and renovated it for residential use. Following various legal issues, the first condominiums in the building were sold in March 2018.

== Site ==
108 Leonard is in the Tribeca neighborhood of Lower Manhattan in New York City, at 346 Broadway. It occupies a city block bounded by Broadway to the west, Leonard Street to the north, Lafayette Street (Note: In the 19th century, Lafayette Street was known as Elm Street.) to the east, and Catherine Lane to the south. The land lot is trapezoidal and covers 28,566 ft^{2} (2,650 m^{2}). The site is long and narrow, measuring about 400 ft (120 m) wide on both Leonard Street to the north and Catherine Lane to the south. However, it only measures 60 ft (18 m) wide on Broadway and about 83 ft (25 m) wide on Lafayette Street. (Note: The Lafayette Street frontage is 82 ft 11.75 in (25 m), the Leonard Street frontage is 399 ft 10 in (121.87 m), and the Catherine Lane frontage is 400 ft 6.5 in (122 m).) There are vaults under the sidewalk on Broadway, Catherine Lane, and Leonard Street. Nearby sites include 319 Broadway to the southwest; 33 Thomas Street to the west; 359 Broadway and 361 Broadway to the northwest; and the Jacob K. Javits Federal Building to the south.

Prior to the development of the current building, the site had been occupied by the Appleton Building, designed by Frederic Diaper and built from 1838 to 1840. The building housed the New York Society Library until 1856, when publishing firm D. Appleton & Company moved into the space. The D. Appleton structure burned down in 1867 and was replaced with the first New York Life building on the site, designed by Griffith Thomas and completed in 1870. Until 1894, the site also contained a firehouse for Engine 31 of the New York City Fire Department, at 116 Leonard Street, as well as the clubhouse of the Merchant's Club at 108 Leonard Street.

== Architecture ==
108 Leonard was constructed as the New York Life Building and was finished in two phases. The eastern part of the building was built from 1894 to 1896 and was initially designed by Stephen Decatur Hatch, who died midway during construction. McKim, Mead & White oversaw the completion of the eastern section. The western part of the building, including a three-story clock tower, was constructed from 1896 to 1898 and was designed solely by McKim, Mead & White.

108 Leonard occupies its entire block and has a narrow massing. The site slopes downward from west to east, so the building is 12 stories tall at its western end and 13 stories tall at its eastern end. Including the clock tower, the building has 15 physical above-ground stories; the top three stories are within the clock tower. (Note: El-Ad classifies the true number of stories above ground as "construction floors", which are labeled with a different "marketing floor" number. Numbering is as follows: Cellar, cellar mezzanine – not numbered; Basement – floor 1; 1st through 11th stories – floors 2 through 12 (floor number 13 is skipped); 12th story – floor 14; 12th-story mezzanine – floor 14M; 13th through 15th stories – floors 15 through 17) There are also two below-ground levels: a basement is at the same height as the ground on Lafayette Street, as well as a cellar completely below ground. Mezzanines above the cellar and the 12th story are excluded from the floor count. A two-story penthouse structure was constructed above the 12th story (labeled as floor 14) in the 2010s. The penthouse contains setbacks at both its lower and upper levels. The top of the clock tower is physically equivalent to the 17th story, while the primary roof is 210 ft (64 m) above ground. The basement through 17th story are numbered as floors 1 through 19, respectively; floor number 13 is skipped.

=== Facade ===
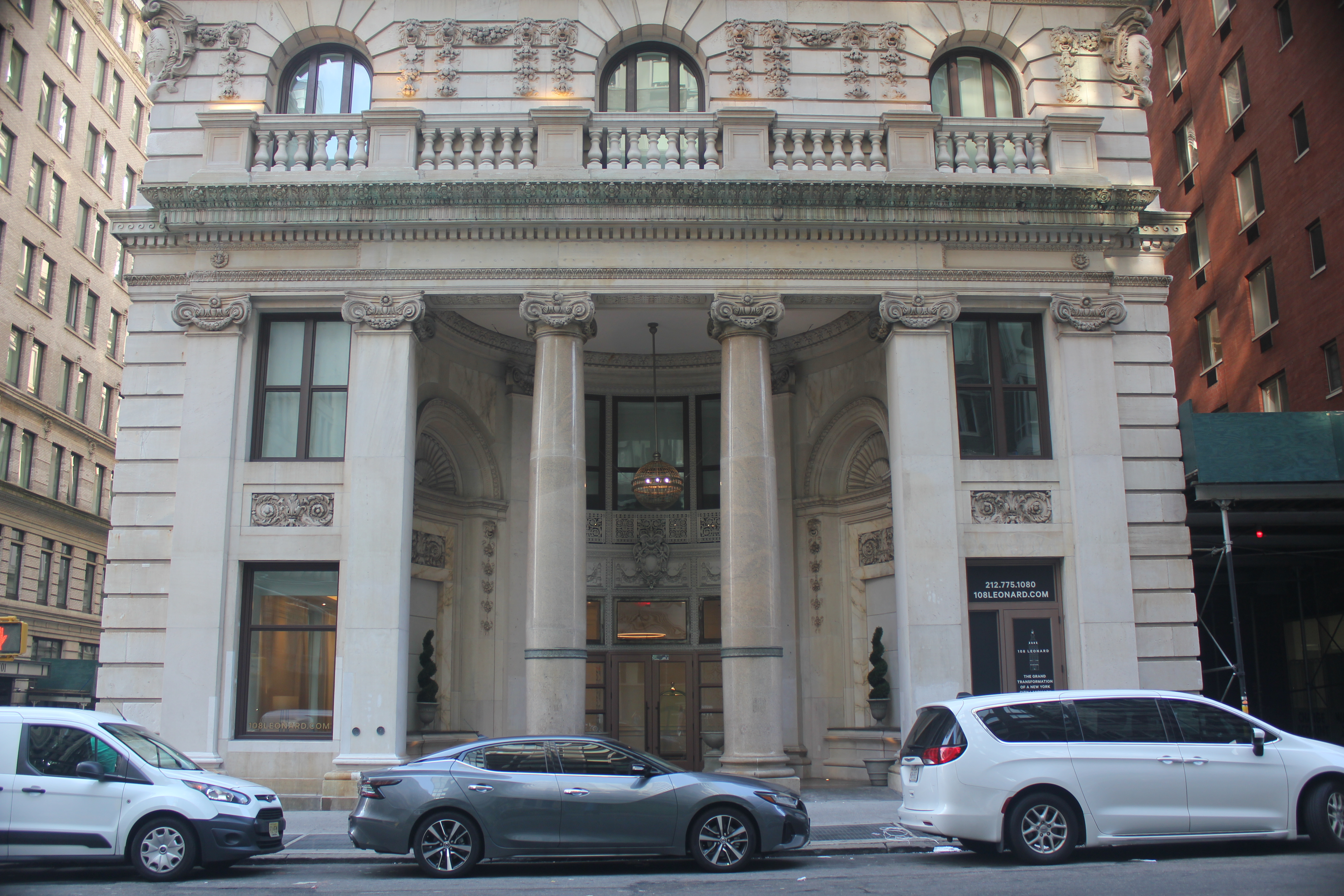
Main entrance pavilion as seen from Broadway

108 Leonard's facade is largely made of white Tuckahoe marble, except the southern elevation, which is made of brick and terracotta. The facade is divided vertically into 26 bays to the north and south, three bays to the west, and five bays to the east. The northern and southern elevations are flanked by end pavilions measuring three bays wide, and there is also a four-bay-wide entrance pavilion at the center of the northern elevation. There are three residential entrances, one each on Broadway, Leonard Street, and Lafayette Street. In addition, there is an entrance on Broadway leading to retail space; an entrance on Leonard Street, leading to a community facility and banking hall; a garage door on Leonard Street; and three service entrances on Catherine Lane.

The exterior walls are made of marble, granite, terracotta, and brick, while the windows are generally made of glass and aluminum. Surrounding the entire building at the 13th story (floor 15) are stone parapets, which are decorated with openwork motifs of interlocking circles. In addition, floors 16 and 17 are surrounded by glass-and-aluminum parapets.

==== Broadway pavilion ====
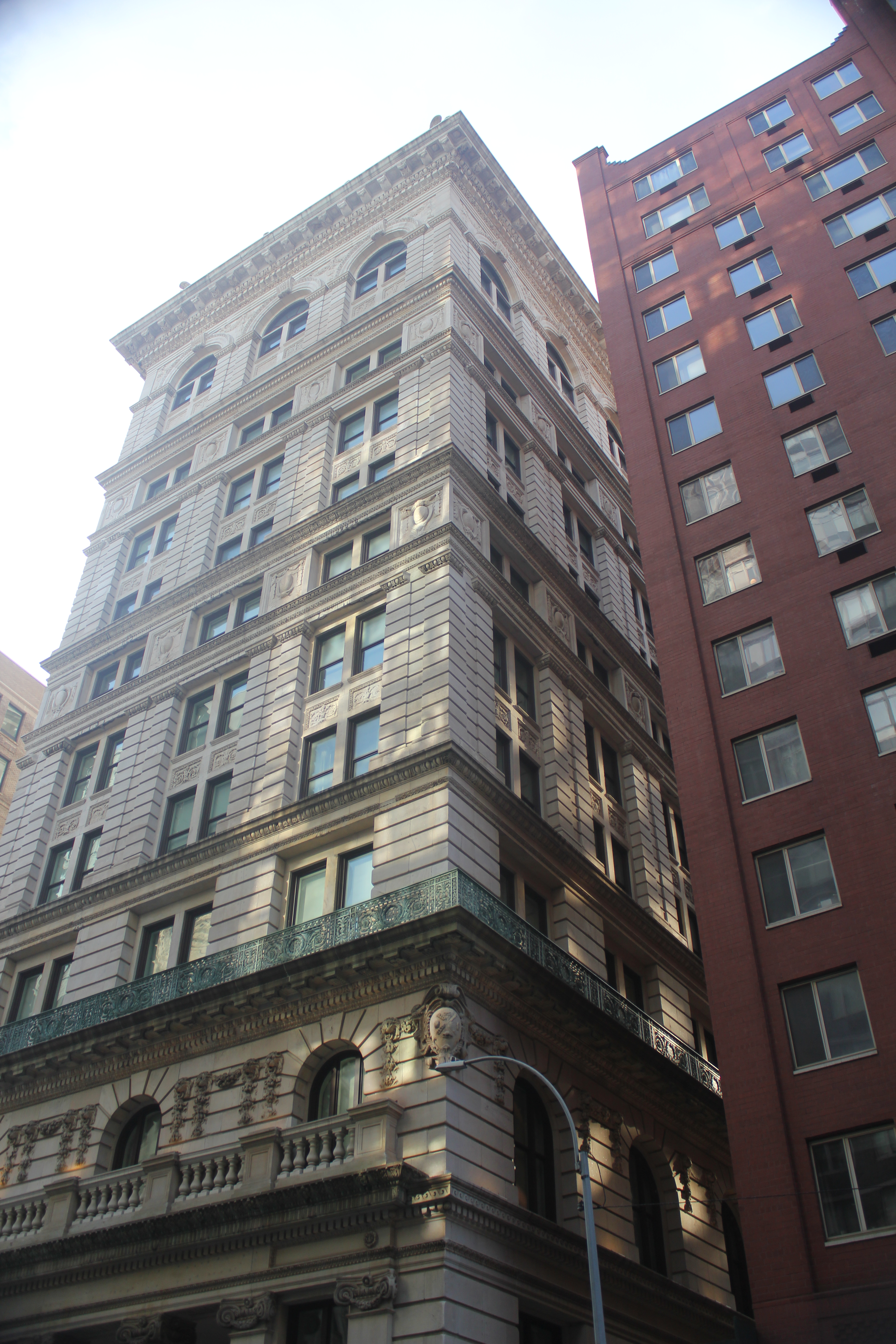
View of the Broadway pavilion from Catherine Lane

The western end of 108 Leonard comprises a pavilion measuring three bays wide on Broadway, Catherine Lane, and Leonard Street. All three elevations of this pavilion are clad with rusticated blocks of marble. The main entrance on Broadway is designed to resemble a portico, with double-height pilasters and freestanding columns topped by an entablature with a balustrade. The portico originally contained six freestanding columns that projected from the facade, but these were removed in 1912 at the request of the government of New York City. Each of the polished-granite pillars weighed over 16 short tons (14 long tons; 15 t) and measured 23 ft (7.0 m) long by 3 ft (0.91 m) across. The capitals of each column are decorated with rosettes and swags in a modified Ionic order. Recessed within this main entrance is a double-height curved vestibule, which includes two archways with acanthus and scallop decorations. The archways themselves contain cast-bronze window frames above the doors, while the vestibule's ceiling contains a coffered ceiling with an eagle motif at the center. On either side of the entrance are panels with acanthus motifs.

The third story contains round-arched windows, separated by lions' heads and garlands; the corners are decorated with cartouches. A cornice with modillions runs above the 3rd story, above which is a bronze railing. Band courses run horizontally across the facade above the 4th, 6th, 7th, 9th, and 10th stories, thereby dividing the facade into alternating sections of one and two stories. In addition, the windows on the 7th and 10th stories are flanked by panels with acanthus-leaf motifs. At the 11th and 12th stories, the window openings are composed of double-height arches. Above this is a deep cornice with modillions. The attic is surrounded by a balustrade with stone eagles at each of its corners, which represent New York Life. This balustrade supports a clock tower that rises another two stories above the main roof (see 108 Leonard § Clock tower).

==== Lafayette Street pavilion ====
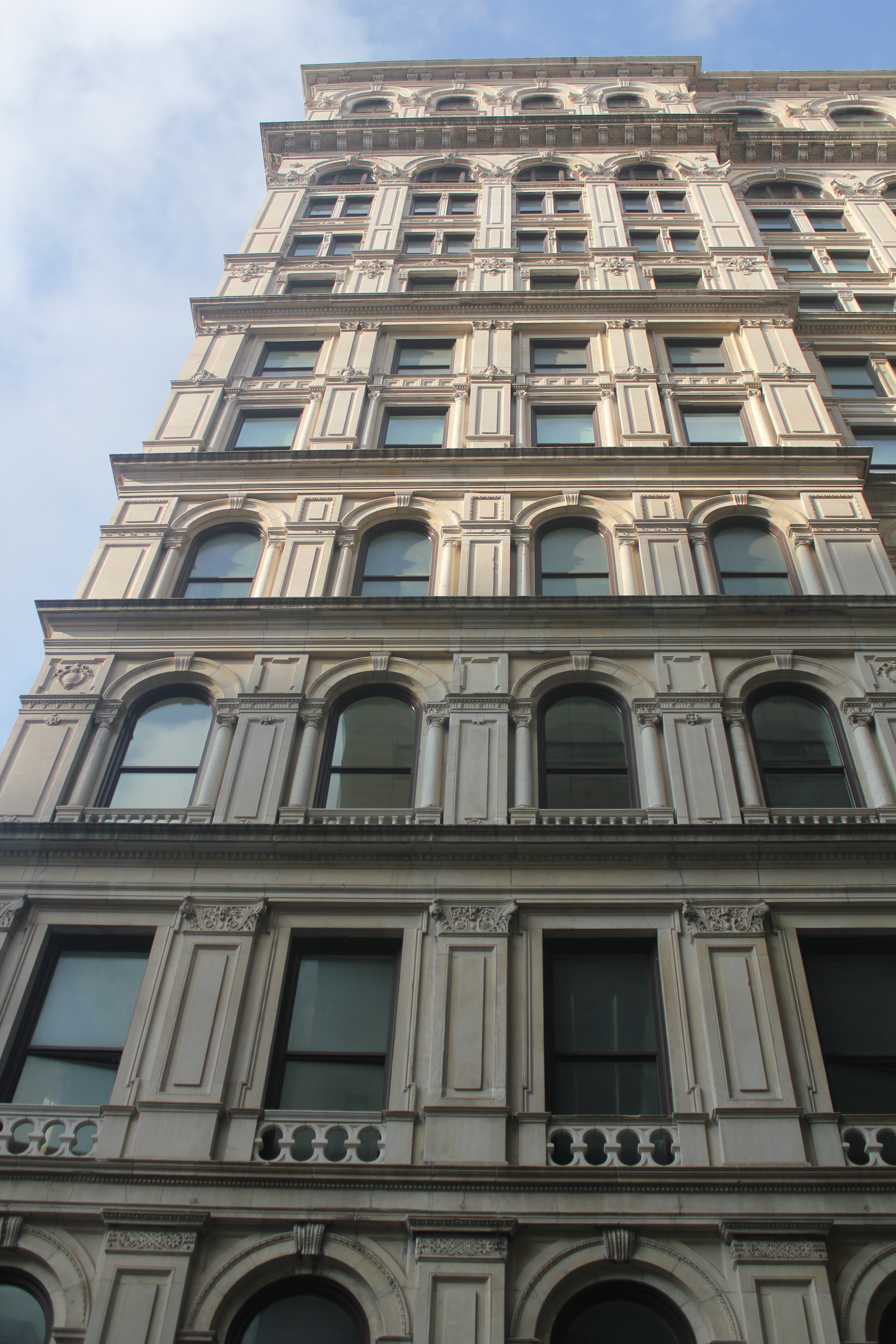
View of the Lafayette Street pavilion from Leonard Street

The eastern end of 108 Leonard comprises a pavilion measuring five bays wide on Lafayette Street and four bays wide on Catherine Lane and Leonard Street. On the eastern elevation, the center bay projects slightly from the facade. At ground level (actually the basement), there is a low archway with two columns on either side. The center windows on the 1st and 2nd stories contain colonnettes, which divide the archways there into three segments. The other bays each contain one round-arched window on the 1st story and one square-headed window on the 2nd story.

There are two windows per bay in the remaining stories; the windows on the 3rd, 4th, 10th, and 12th stories are round-arched, while the other windows are square-headed. Band courses and cornices run horizontally across this pavilion above each of the first four stories and above the 6th, 7th, 9th, and 10th stories. As in the Broadway pavilion, there are relief panels between the windows on the 7th and 10th stories. The parapet above the 12th story contains a clock tower with one face, which measures 12 ft (3.7 m) across. The dome of this tower contains a copper roof.

==== Leonard Street and Catherine Lane ====
For the most part, the Leonard Street and Catherine Lane elevations are divided into bays with two windows per story. At the center of the Leonard Street elevation, there is a three-bay-wide entrance pavilion that projects slightly from the facade. At ground level (actually the basement), the main entrance is through a double-height round arch. The doors in this arch are topped by spandrel panels with foliate patterns. The main entrance is flanked by two pairs of two single-story pilasters, one stacked above the other. The bays on each side of the doorways contain round-arched openings. Above the basement, the central bay of the entrance pavilion contains three windows per story, while the other bays contain two windows. The windows on the upper stories are largely similar in design to those on the rest of the facade.

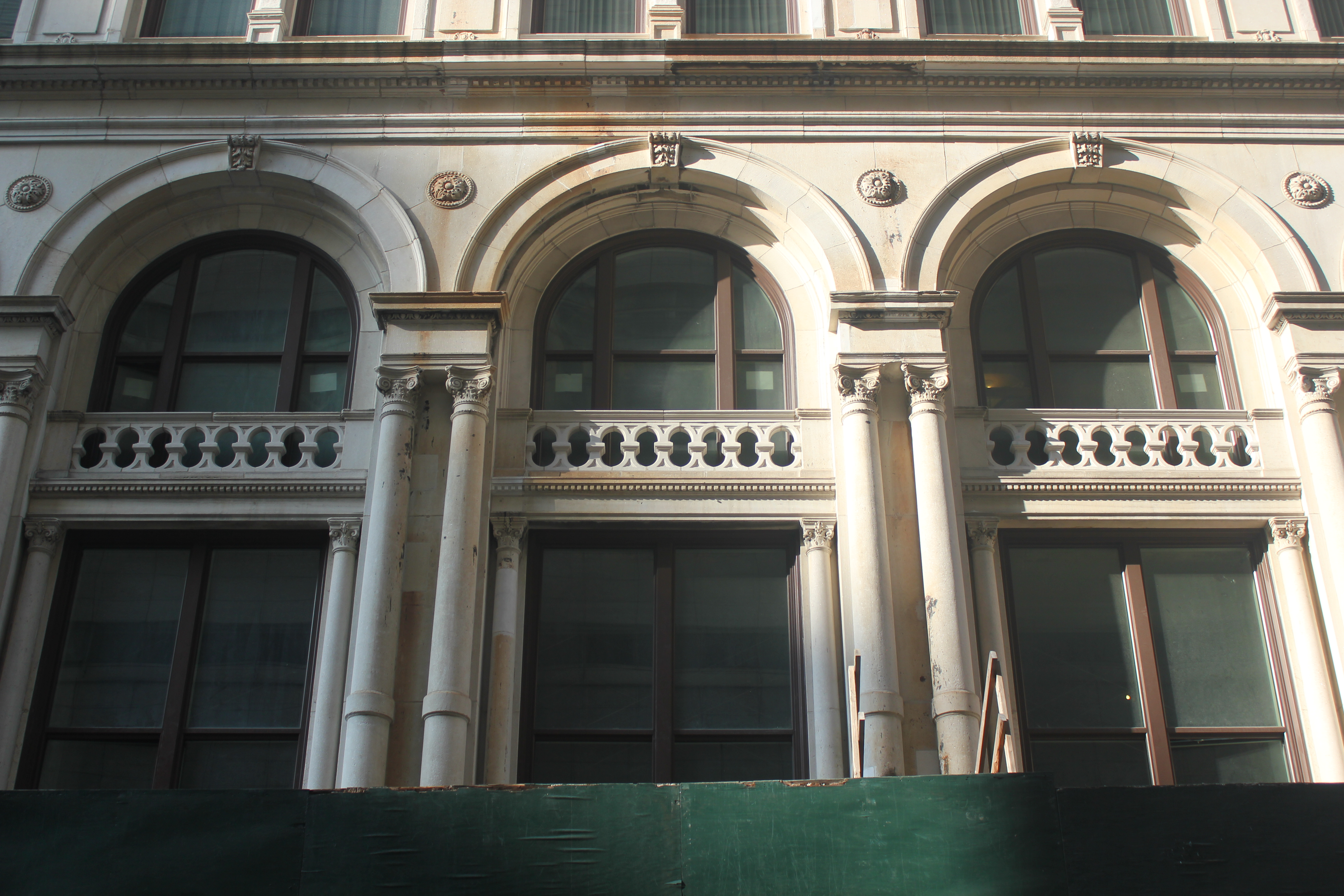
Arched windows east of the main entrance at the base of the Leonard Street elevation

The remainder of the Leonard Street elevation is divided by band courses at the same levels as on the Lafayette Street pavilion. There are nine bays to the west of the entrance pavilion, excluding the Broadway pavilion. In the western bays, the 1st and 2nd stories contain square-headed windows with composite columns between them. There are seven such bays to the east of the entrance pavilion, excluding the Lafayette Street pavilion. These bays contain double-height archways on the 1st and 2nd stories, since these originally overlooked the general office. The windows on the other stories are separated by flat pilasters; the windows on the 3rd, 4th, 10th, and 12th stories are round-arched, while the other windows are square-headed. Above the 12th story is a balustrade with a parapet.

The Catherine Lane elevation is mostly clad in gray brick and terracotta, with the exception of the three westernmost and four easternmost bays, which are respectively part of the Broadway and Lafayette Street pavilions. There are two rectangular windows in each bay, except in the end pavilions. As with the Leonard Street elevation, the central three bays project from the facade. There are nine bays to the west and seven bays to the east, excluding the pavilions on either end. The 11th and 12th stories contain round-arched windows above a cornice with modillions.

=== Roof ===
The roofs contain insulating membranes, which are covered with pavers. There are five skylights on the roof, above unit 14A; the original skylights above the building's emergency stair have been sealed. The primary roof above floor 16 contains dormer structures for elevators, stairs, and mechanical equipment.

==== Clock tower ====
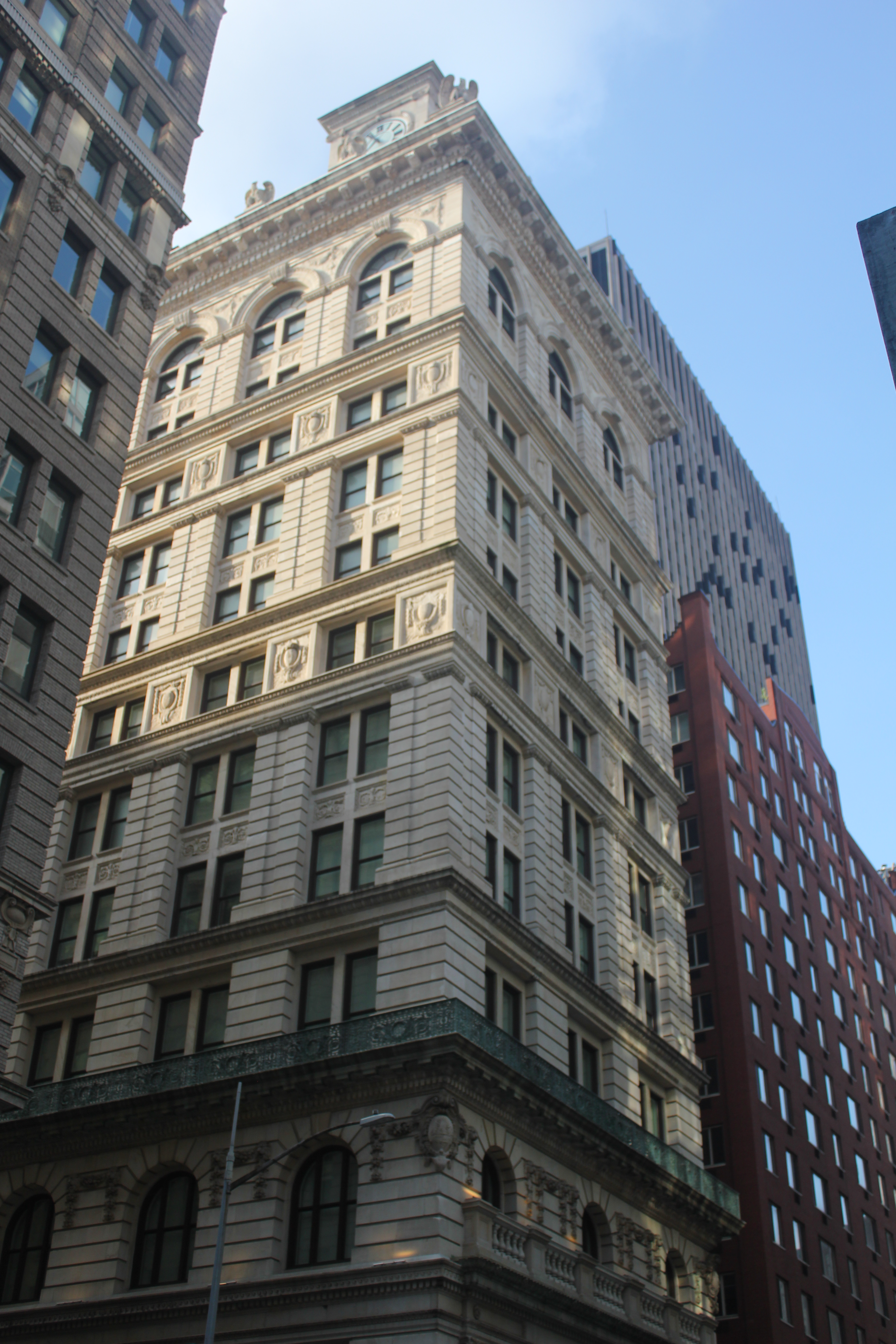
View of the Broadway pavilion from the north, with the clock tower on top

Above the 12th story, on the Broadway side of the building, is a clock manufactured by the E. Howard Watch and Clock Company. The base of the clock tower is two stories tall, while the clock tower itself rises another three stories. The clock has four faces, each measuring 12 ft (3.7 m) in diameter and marked with Roman numerals. Each corner of the clock tower was ornamented by a 20-foot-tall column. The clock tower was topped with by a 33 ft-tall (10 m), 8-short-ton (7.1-long-ton; 7.3 t) sculpture made by French-American sculptor Philip Martiny. The piece consisted of four 11 ft-tall (3.4 m) crouching figures of Atlas, which supported a hollow globe measuring 15 feet wide. A solid sphere measuring 8 ft (2.4 m) wide was placed within the globe to give the impression of solidity. The globe was topped by a 7 ft-tall (2.1 m) eagle. The gigantic statue was removed sometime after 1928 (Note: Untapped Cities states that the statue was removed in the 1940s, while the city's "clock master" Marvin Schneider says that the statue was removed in 1950.) and has been lost ever since.

Inside the clock tower, on the 13th story (labeled as floor 17 (Note: Three different floor numbering systems can be used. The rectangular room in the clock tower is physically 13 stories from the ground, being directly above the 12th story. However, it is equivalent to the 15th story of the penthouse above the rest of the building, since there is a triple-height gap between the clock tower and the preceding story. The rectangular room is labeled as floor 17.)), is a double-height rectangular room with brick walls, four windows, and exposed ceiling beams. A doorway leads from the room to an outdoor terrace. From the 1970s until 2013, this space was occupied by the 10,000 ft^{2} (930 m^{2}) Clocktower Gallery. A metal spiral staircase leads up to the clock's machine room, which is physically on the 15th floor. The machine room is surrounded by the clock's four faces. The machinery in the machine room includes a 1,000 lb (450 kg) weight, which descends to strike a 5,000 lb (2,300 kg) bell. (Note: According to the American Architect and Building News, the bell weighed 6,000 lb (2,700 kg), and the weights were a combined 3,000 lb (1,400 kg).) The bell was made by the McShane Bell Foundry. A hammer, powered by a pair of 800 lb (360 kg) weights, strikes the bell at every hour. The clock was wound using a small hand crank, and it had to be re-wound every seven days. Until the 2010s, this was one of a few remaining mechanically wound clocks in New York City. As of 2023, the clock was not operational.

=== Interior ===
The original building's structural frame consists of steel beams, which are spanned by flat arches made of terracotta and are covered with a layer of concrete. The western section of the original building is supported by built-up groups of columns, while the eastern section contains circular and rectangular cast iron columns. The penthouse contains floor slabs and columns made of cast-in-place concrete. The basement could accommodate a live load of up to 100 pounds per square foot (4.8 kilopascals), while the upper stories could accommodate live loads of 75 psf (3.6 kPa). In addition, the stairs, elevator lobbies, public areas, and mechanical areas of the penthouses can accommodate up to 100 psf (4.8 kPa), while the apartments in the penthouses can hold up to 40 psf (1.9 kPa).

When the New York Life Building was constructed, each story was laid out around a passageway that ran from west to east, and the office (later residential) space was clustered north and south of this passageway. There are equipment rooms on the cellar, on floor 14, and on the roof above the penthouse (labeled as floor 16).

==== Lobby, elevators, and stairs ====
The Leonard Street entrance leads to a double-height main lobby. The space is designated as a New York City interior landmark and contains a terrazzo floor and marble walls. The north wall of the lobby, on either side of the doorway, contains motifs of triple garlands. The lobby is surrounded by a band with a Greek key motif, placed about halfway up the wall. Above this band, on the eastern and western walls, are two Ionic pilasters, which in turn support a cornice that is decorated with rosettes. These pilasters divide the walls into three panels, each with a bronze frame and bronze centerpiece. The lobby is flanked by a pair of staircases, which rise to the first story (labeled as floor 2). These staircases contain marble balustrades, as well as newel posts with bronze globes at the top and bottom of each stair. There is also a bronze chandelier hanging from the center from the ceiling. In the 2010s, the floors were renovated with wooden planks laid in a chevron pattern. The modern-day residential building has two additional lobbies, in addition to the landmarked main lobby.

The basement and first story of the main lobby lead to two semicircular elevator banks of similar design. The lower level leads to a semicircular hall that connects with seven elevator cabs, as well as a doorway at the center, flanked by half-columns and pilasters. The coffered ceiling contains lanterns, which hang from rosettes and illuminate the space in front of each elevator door. The upper level is similar, except that the ceiling has a floral molding instead. Hatch's initial plan for a circular stairway, connecting each floor near the center of the elevator lobby, was scrapped when McKim, Mead & White took over the design. The elevators were removed in the 2010s, and the elevator doors were replaced with grilles. Three new elevator cores (each with two passenger elevators), as well as a service elevator stopping at all stories, were installed during the 2010s renovation.

108 Leonard contains six emergency exit stairs, one of which is an official New York City landmark. The landmark-protected stairway is made of stone and cast-iron. It is to the west of the elevator hall, rising to the 14th story. The staircase contains marble steps, classical decorations, and a metal railing decorated with acanthus and Greek key designs. The walls of the stairway contain marble paneling on the lowest two stories, while those on the other stories are decorated with marble dadoes.

==== Banking room and hallway ====
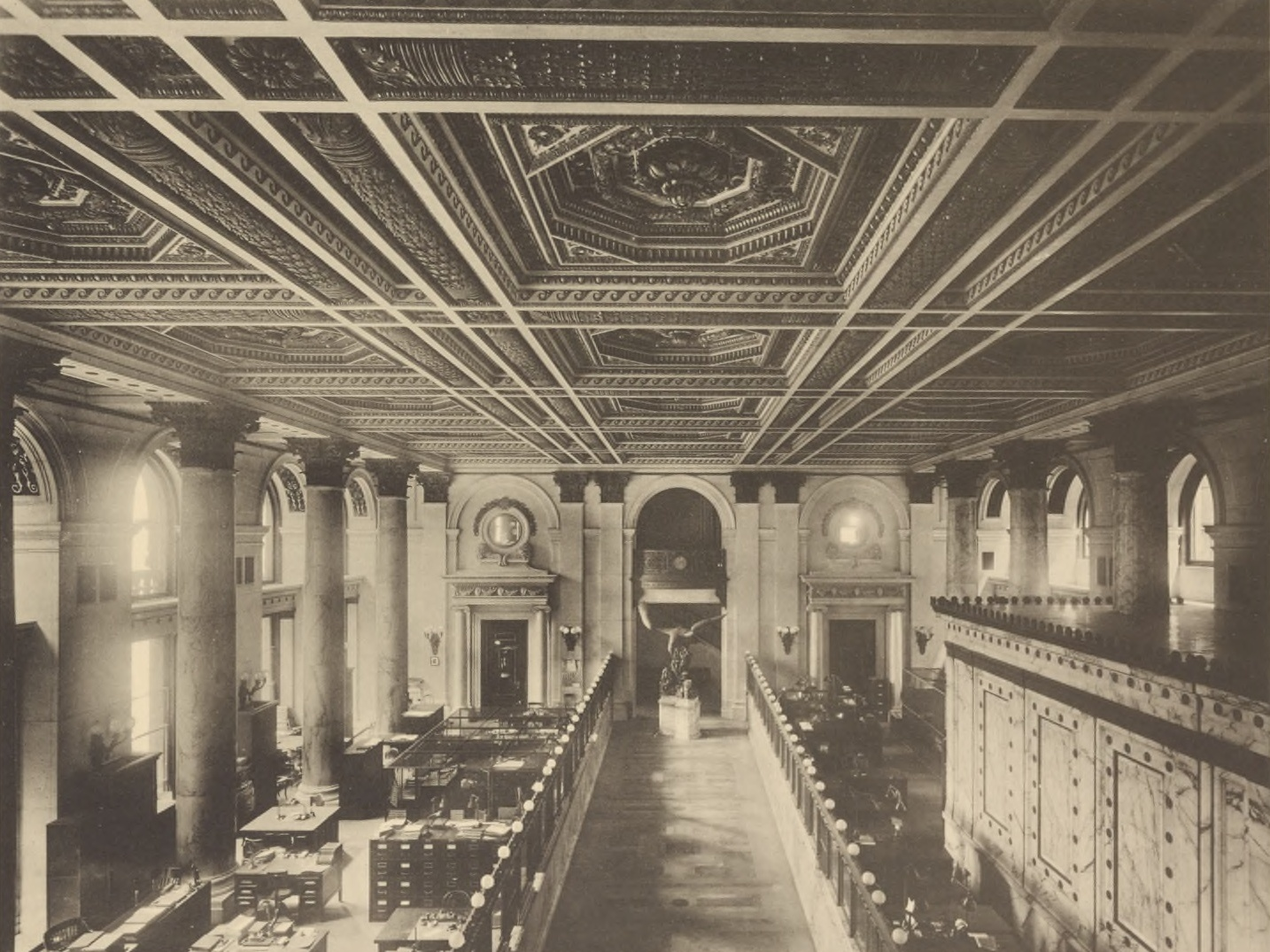
The banking room as depicted in a monograph of McKim, Mead & White's work

The former New York Life banking room, known as the general office, is on the east side of the building, occupying the first and second stories (floors 2 and 3) next to the lobby. The double-height space measures three bays from north to south and six bays from east to west. The general office contains double-height windows facing north and south, as well as freestanding Corinthian-style columns that are arranged into two groups. Tellers' cages, with screens at their tops, were arranged around the room. The ceiling is painted and contains gilded octagonal coffers, which in turn are separated by a grid of molded bands. The south wall contains a marble safe, which was originally freestanding. The west and east walls each contain three arches. The central arches on either side lead to the hallways on floor 3, and the two outer archways on the eastern wall contains bulls-eye windows. The balcony at floor 3 was part of Hatch's original plan but was removed from McKim, Mead & White's final design; it was added in a later renovation. In the 2010s, the banking room was converted into a banquet hall. An elevator connects both levels of the banking hall.

East of the banking room, a narrow flight of stairs leads up from floor 2. The staircase contains a decorative metal railing and leads to floor 3 and the general office's balcony. The hallway on floor 3 contains plaster walls; rectangular doorways with console brackets; a plaster ceiling with panels; and a classically inspired cornice. The ceiling of the hallway includes a plaster relief with New York Life's monogram, as well as caduceus motifs. There are similar hallways on the upper floors, which contain floors and wainscoting made of marble, as well as metal decorations.

==== Executive offices ====
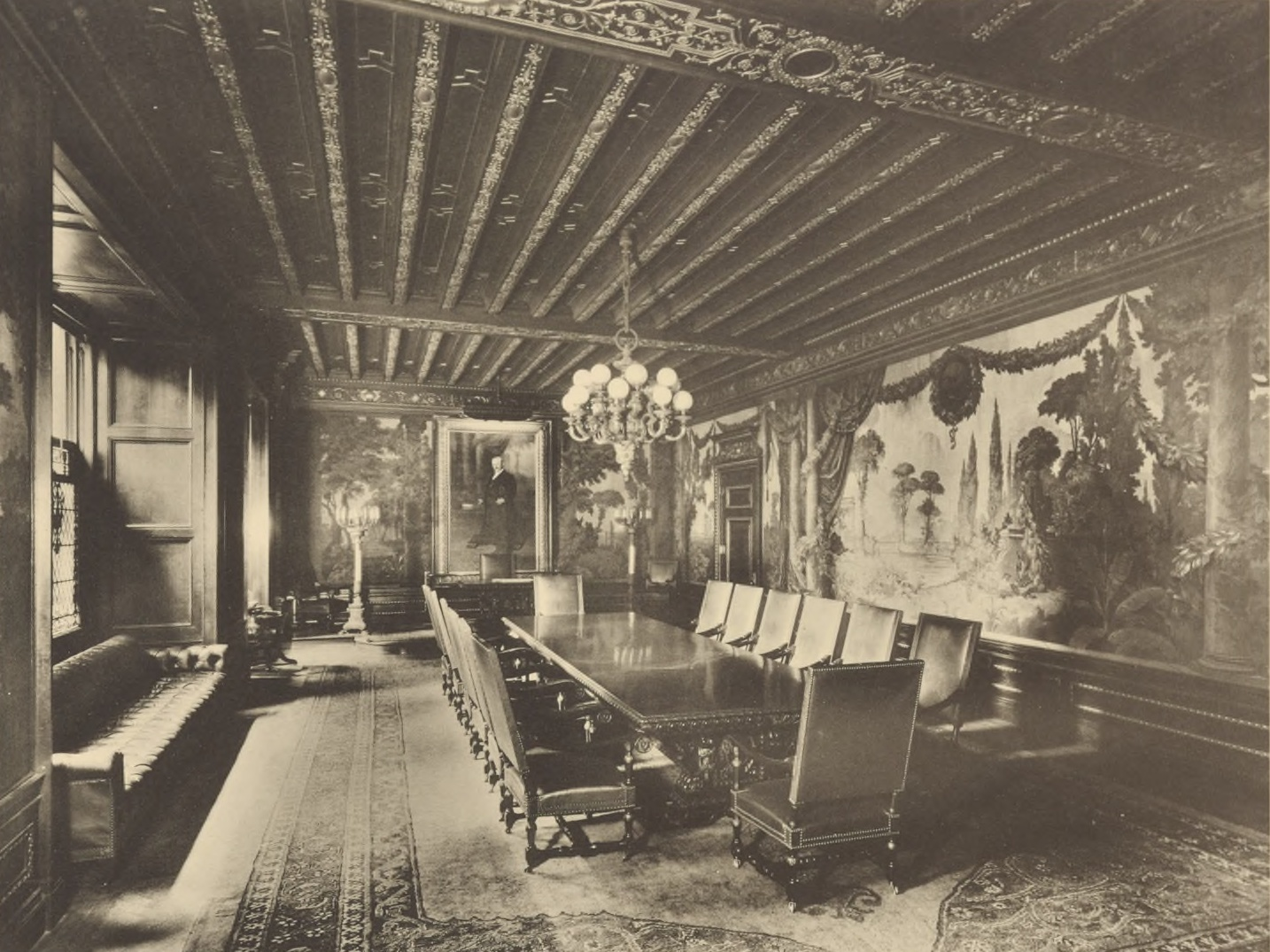
The former directors' room as depicted in a monograph of McKim, Mead & White's work

The hallway on floor 3 leads to a group of rooms that originally served as executive offices; Hatch may have designed these rooms. These offices were originally decorated with wooden moldings, a pair of fireplace mantels with garlands, and neoclassical doorways, but these were subsequently modified with linoleum floors and fluorescent lights. The ceilings of these rooms contain caduceus motifs and monograms, similar to those in the hallway, while the windows are deeply recessed and rise from the floor. The south wall of the former committee room included an elliptical arch with a tripartite window. The space occupied by these rooms was converted to residential units 3N and 3P in the 2010s. Floor 3 originally had a room for New York Life's board of directors, which was decorated by Maitland Armstrong. The room was relocated to 51 Madison Avenue in 1928.

On the fourth story (floor 5), above the eastern end of the building, was a president's suite designed by McKim, Mead & White. The president's suite had an anteroom with marble paneling, as well as Ionic pilasters that flanked beige-and-black panels on the walls. The anteroom had six doorways, each of which had a marble floor and wooden doors with etched-glass panels. The paneled ceiling was decorated with rosettes and was surrounded by a molding with a doubled Greek-key motif. This room has also been modified with linoleum floors and fluorescent lights. The president's office itself was a rectangular space, with rectangular windows to the east and round-arched windows to the north. The walls were decorated with a dado, Ionic pilasters, and a cornice all made of mahogany. The plaster ceiling had three oval panels and was surrounded by garlands, a Greek key motif, and rosettes. As part of a 2010s renovation, these decorations were relocated to the first story, and the presidents' room was used as a private anteroom for residents. The space occupied by the president's office was converted to residential units 5N and 5P in the 2010s.

On the eastern half of the 11th and 12th stories (floors 12 and 14) were the quarters of the Merchants' Club, also designed by Armstrong. The lower story of the club contained a hallway measuring 100 by 15 ft (30.5 by 4.6 m) across and 30 ft (9.1 m) high. It was decorated with Greek mosaic tiles; a marble wainscoting topped by a light-brown fresco; and a multicolored ceiling. At the far end of the hall was an archway trimmed in brown marble and mahogany, which led to a main dining room. On the right (south) side of the hallway was a reception room; a smoking and reading room; and an office and a cashier's room. All were decorated in leather and contained mahogany furnishings. On the left (north) side of the hallway was a main dining room, decorated in a similar style to the other club rooms. A kitchen and some offices were located on the upper story.

==== Residences ====
In the 2010s, the office space was converted to condominiums with between one and four bedrooms. The building has 152 condominiums, which span floors 2 through 16. The clock tower contains a three-story, 6,252-square-foot (580.8 m^{2}) penthouse apartment with five bedrooms and three terraces. Four of the units (PH West, 15A, PH North, and PH East) contain private elevators.

Each unit's ceilings range from 9 to 14 ft (2.7 to 4.3 m) high; on the three highest stories, the apartments have ceilings measuring up to 15 ft (4.6 m) high. The apartments also have "gallery walls", which can display art, as well as kitchens and bathrooms with marble. The building's condominiums contain wooden floors with oak planks laid in a chevron pattern, and some of the condos contain exterior terraces. There are fireplaces in two of the apartments on floor 3 (within the former executive offices), as well as in 11 penthouse apartments. The northeastern corner of floor 5, which was also designated as a New York City interior landmark, was adapted into a three-bedroom apartment.

108 Leonard contains a 20,000-square-foot (1,900 m^{2}) amenity space for residents, such as a swimming pool, fitness center, roof deck, and wine cellar. The swimming pool in the cellar measures 75 by 12 ft (22.9 by 3.7 m) across; next to it are a hot tub, steam room, and men's and women's locker rooms. The cellar also includes a fitness center, a children's playroom, and a residents' lounge with sitting and pantry areas. The building has two bicycle-storage rooms, with a combined capacity of 76 bikes, as well as two package rooms, one each at the residential lobbies on Leonard Street and Broadway. Underneath the Leonard Street sidewalk are vaults at cellar level, which contain 30 private storage bins for residents. There is also a parking lot within a portion of the basement. The parking lot includes 29 parking spaces (26 for residents and three for visitors), as well as an access driveway from Leonard Street, which doubles as a heated motor court. A private deck for residents is located at floors 16 and 17, above the lower and upper levels of the penthouse, respectively.

== History ==
The New York Life Insurance Company had been chartered in 1841 and was originally located in the Financial District of Lower Manhattan. The firm was originally known as the Nautilus Insurance Company, but it assumed the New York Life name in 1849. Its previous structures in New York City had been clustered around Lower Manhattan. By the late 19th century, life insurance companies generally had their own buildings for their offices and branch locations. According to architectural writer Kenneth Gibbs, these buildings allowed each individual company to instill "not only its name but also a favorable impression of its operations" in the general public. This had been a trend since 1870, when the Equitable Life Insurance Company completed the first Equitable Life Building in Manhattan's Financial District. Furthermore, life insurance companies of the late 19th and early 20th centuries generally built massive buildings to fit their large clerical and records-keeping staff.

=== New York Life headquarters ===
==== Original building ====
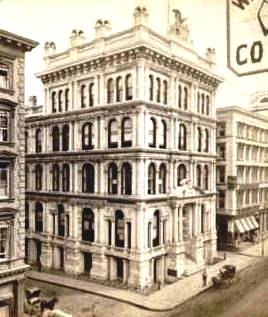
Original building before being extended and then replaced

After plans for the Equitable Life Building were announced, New York Life devised plans for its own headquarters in Lower Manhattan. In 1868, the company selected a site at 346 Broadway, which had formerly contained publishing firm D. Appleton & Company's headquarters. Following an architectural design competition in late 1867, New York Life had hired architect Griffith Thomas to design its new edifice. (Note: Bryant & Gilman, James Renwick Jr., and Leopold Eidlitz also participated in the competition.) The structure is variously described as having been built in the Second Empire style or the Italianate style. New York Life and Equitable Life competed to develop their respective headquarters; the two firms' structures even opened on the same day, May 1, 1870. The two designs inspired those of other insurance buildings nearby, including the headquarters of Mutual Life, Metropolitan Life, and Germania Life.

The 85 ft-high (26 m) building, with four stories and a raised basement, occupied the western half of the block. The site was irregularly shaped, with a frontage of about 200 ft (61 m) on Leonard Street and Catherine Lane. Its marble facade included Ionic columns in a manner resembling the Erechtheion in Athens, as well as heavy plate-glass windows. The basement had brick-and-stone walls; the site sloped downward to the east, where the basement contained storefronts. The central portion of the building was three stories high (excluding the basement) and was flanked by four-story pavilions at either end. The main entrance on Broadway was through a portico, topped by a pediment with an eagle. Running west-east across the first floor was a 12 ft-wide (3.7 m) hallway, which was flanked by two large rooms and connected to a stair with an elevator shaft. The old New York Life Building was one of the first buildings in New York City with an elevator. After the building opened, Henry Fernbach designed a mansard roof, which was completed in 1879.

==== Annex and replacement ====
New York Life gradually purchased the lots on the eastern portion of the block, extending east to Lafayette Street (then known as Elm Street). By the early 1890s, New York Life had acquired all buildings on the eastern portion of the block. New York Life decided to host a closed design competition, hiring five architects and firms (Stephen Decatur Hatch, McKim, Mead & White, George B. Post, Babb, Cook & Willard, and Daniel Burnham) to design an annex to the existing building. This annex would be a 12-story structure faced with marble, except on Catherine Lane, where the facade would be made of brick. Each of the competitors would receive $500 for participating. New York Life had prioritized "the largest possible income...consistent with proper light and air" extending east to Lafayette Street (then known as Elm Street). Architects at the time were typically paid a 5 percent commission, but New York Life was reluctant to pay such a high commission. Four of the five competitors agreed not to receive less than a 5 percent commission, but Hatch was content with a 3.5 percent commission.

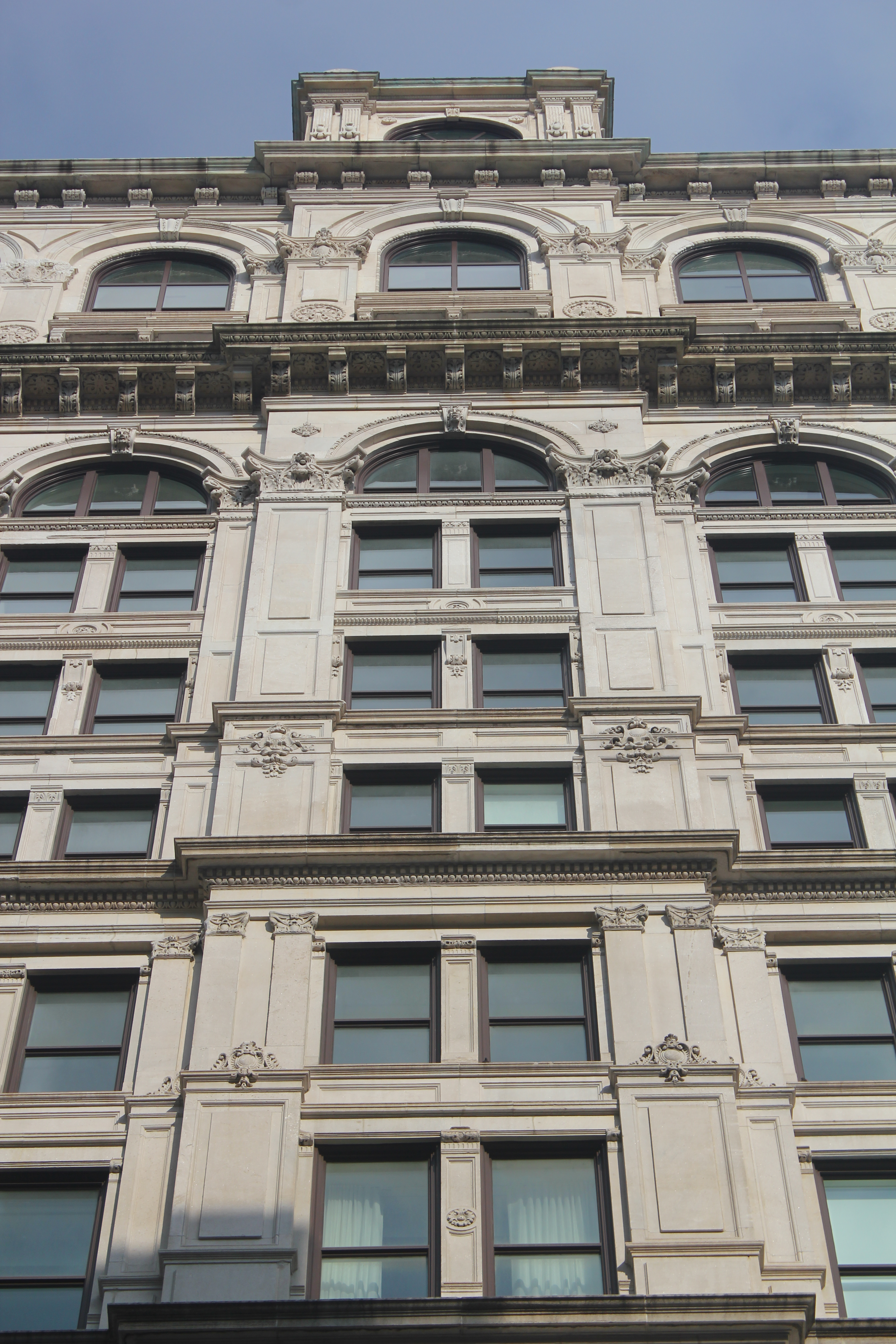
The Lafayette Street pavilion, part of the eastern annex, which was completed in 1896

The company decided in August 1893 to hire Hatch, who was less well-known than the other competitors, to design the annex. Plans for the annex were filed in April 1894. The project would also involve masonry contractor L. W. Armstrong, marble contractor Norcross Company, iron contractor Post and McCord, and carpenter E. Hilbrand. Construction commenced in May 1894, but Hatch died three months later, before construction was completed. After Hatch's death, McKim, Mead & White took over the project, designing an annex that extended about 200 ft (61 m) west from Elm Street. The annex ultimately cost $1.5 million to construct. The Merchant's Club moved into the top two stories of the annex, which opened in February 1896. The New-York Tribune wrote that the structure would be "one of the most striking improvements in Broadway" south of Canal Street. The New York Times described the New York Life Building as being in a "rivalry" with the Central National Bank Building to the south, at Pearl Street and Broadway.

During the construction of the annex, New York Life decided to replace the original building as well. Although the white-marble facade, cornices, arched windows, and the proportions of the annex harmonized with that of the original building, New York Life officials felt the juxtaposition of the original building and annex "would not be an aesthetic success". M cKim, Mead & White designed the replacement in the Italian Renaissance Revival style. The replacement structure and its clock tower were designed by Henry Bacon of McKim, Mead & White, under the supervision of William Rutherford Mead. In December 1895, McKim, Mead & White filed plans for the structure at a projected cost of $1 million.

During the replacement building's construction, falling masonry injured two workers in 1896, and an elevator collapsed and injured six workers in 1897. As part of the project, New York Life wanted to take over Catherine Lane and build vaults underneath it; this was difficult because the alley was city-owned property. In addition, New York Life wanted to build an entrance portico on Broadway, but New York City's commissioner of public works had initially forbidden the portico's construction. New York Life was eventually allowed to build a projecting portico with six columns and an ornate balustrade. The Merchants' Association moved into the ground floor of the structure in July 1897. McKim, Mead & White completed the replacement building in April 1898. (Note: Roth 1983, p. 403, writes that the plans for the building had been drawn in 1894, with construction beginning in 1896. According to Roth, the eastern section was completed in 1898, and the western section was completed the following year. However, The New York Times reports that the eastern section was already open by 1896.)

==== Early 20th century ====
New York Life occupied the rebuilt edifice for three decades after the expansions were completed, and the structure became known as the "Temple of Humanity". In the early 1900s, tenants included law firm Sullivan, Goldsmith & Engel; numbering-machine manufacturer Bates Machine Company; and bank Trust Company of the Republic. New York Life bought an adjacent site in 1904, intending to construct a quarters for the company's growing clerical staff. Afterward, the company rented out the newly vacated space at 346 Broadway. Ten people were hurt in 1911 when an elevator in the building fell down eight stories. The next year, the portico in front of the building's Broadway entrance was removed. By the late 1910s, the surrounding area had become a hub for fashion and textile companies. At the time, four stories in the New York Life Building were devoted exclusively to hosiery and underwear firms.

During the 1920s, New York Life underwent another period of rapid growth, and the company's operations could no longer fit in the 346 Broadway building. As a result, New York Life decided to expand into the upper floors, which were occupied by knitted-goods firms; all the knitted-goods tenants decided to relocate across Broadway simultaneously. Even this was not enough for New York Life, which in 1924 announced plans to build a skyscraper uptown at 51 Madison Avenue, on the site of Madison Square Garden. A one-foot-square piece of masonry fell from 346 Broadway in 1927, although no one was hurt. On November 15, 1928, New York Life transferred 75 million documents representing $6.85 billion in policies to the new building. An additional $675 million in securities was transported to the new structure, protected by 100 armored cars with machine guns.

=== Private office building ===
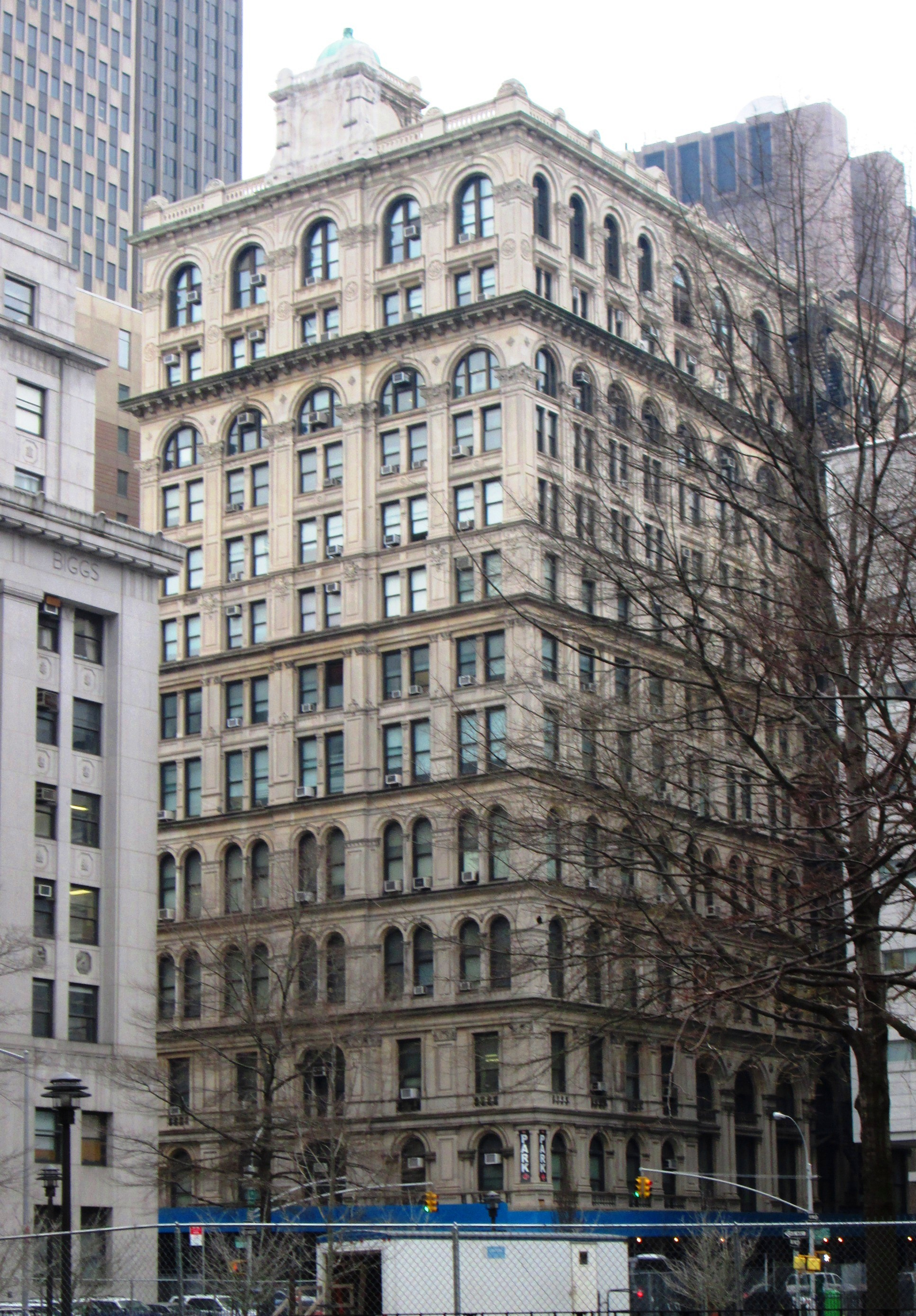
View of the building from Collect Pond Park to the east

After New York Life vacated 346 Broadway, the building started to attract clothing firms. Among these companies was A. A. Smith & Son, which had been one of the building's first tenants but had moved out during the 1910s. The building's tenants included three outerwear producers at the end of 1930, and the Charles F. Noyes Company took over as the building's leasing agent the same year. Several city government agencies then leased space in the building, including the Department of Water Supply (which leased the basement, 11th, and 12th floors); the Department of Public Welfare; and the Department of Finance's Emergency Revenue division. Other tenants around this time included the Veterans Voters League. When the New York state government's Mortgage Commission Servicing Corporation leased four floors in 1935, the structure was renamed the Mortgage Commission Servicing Corporation Building. The corporation moved into the building that December and leased two more stories shortly afterward, occupying half of the structure.

The building was fully occupied in the early 1940s. The New York branch of the federal government's Veterans Administration moved into 346 Broadway in 1942, leasing four floors with an option for four more. The VA expanded its space the next year, and it occupied the entirety of 346 Broadway and the neighboring 350 Broadway by 1944. New York Life sold the building in August 1945 to the City Investing Company, led by Robert Dowling. The building was renovated around 1947, when steam pipes and electric elevators were installed. Charles F. Noyes and the City Investing Company each owned a 50 percent stake in the building until 1948, when Noyes gave his ownership stake to the Jessie Smith Noyes Foundation to fund scholarships for college students.

The East New York Savings Bank placed a $1 million mortgage loan on the building in 1951. The VA office in the building was transferred to Philadelphia the same year. The City Investing Company sold 346 Broadway to New York Equities, a syndicate led by David Rapoport, at the beginning of 1952. At the time, the building was valued at $1 million, while the land was worth an additional $1.6 million. During this decade, tenants included the Office of Price Stabilization, as well as recruitment offices for the United States Navy and the United States Marine Corps. In addition, the United States Agency for International Development opened a recruitment office in the main lobby in 1967.

=== City government ownership ===
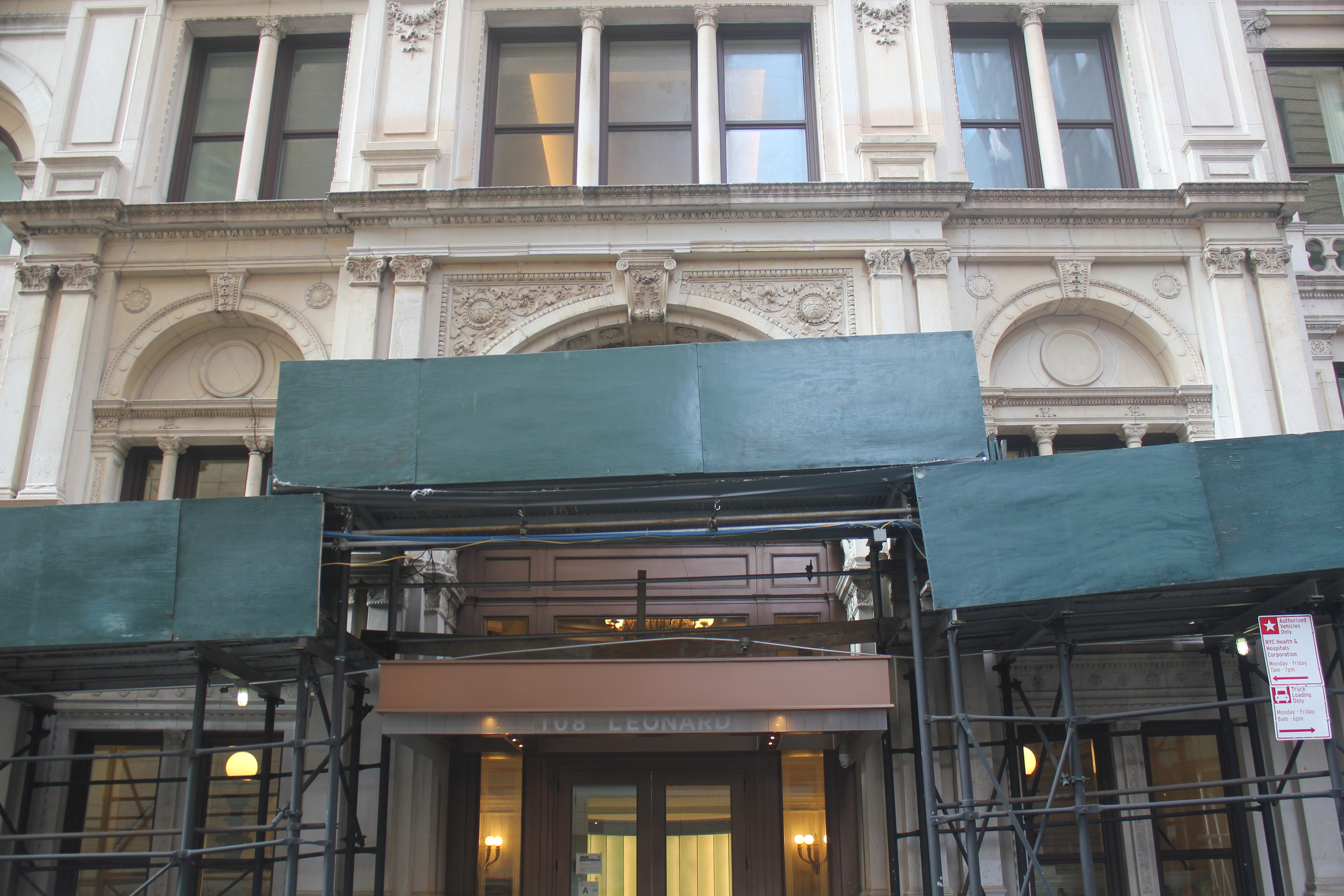
Entrance to the building from Leonard Street

In 1967, the New York City government acquired the building and moved several city agencies there. The city's Summons Court, which itself was nicknamed "346", moved into the building. 346 Broadway also hosted some Criminal Court cases during the early 1970s, as well as the Criminal Court's Summons Part office, where residents could file complaints about incidents where the New York City Police Department declined to make an arrest. The first alternative dispute resolution center in New York City opened within the building in 1975. The Clocktower art gallery, operated by the Institute for Art and Urban Resources, had opened by 1973; it occupied an underused space on the 13th floor. The Summons Court was handling one hundred thousand cases annually by the late 1970s. Meanwhile, the building had become dilapidated; The New York Times wrote that "the rooms at 346 have not been painted in at least a dozen years, dirt on the windows blocks out the sun and more than half the light fixtures have broken bulbs". The Criminal Court Summons Part was relocated from the building in 1979, at which point between 2.5 million and 3 million summonses were stored in cabinets and drawers across the building.

City employees Marvin Schneider and Eric Reiner restored 346 Broadway's clock in 1980. The city government would not let Schneider and Reiner fix the clock without liability insurance, so New York Life donated an insurance policy for the two men. Schneider had never fixed a clock before, but he thought 346 Broadway's broken clock signified "a city that wasn't working". After fixing the clock, Schneider, Reiner, and George Whaley were asked to fix clocks in other city buildings, and they continued to wind 346 Broadway's clock every week. In addition, Schneider began petitioning the New York City Landmarks Preservation Commission (LPC) to designate the former New York Life Building as a city landmark. The building was added to the National Register of Historic Places in 1982. In part due to Schneider's advocacy, the LPC designated the building's exterior and parts of the interior as a landmark on February 12, 1987; the interior-landmark designation covered ten separate parts of the building.

City officials and former Rikers Island prisoners built five courtrooms in the building during the 1980s; the new courtrooms did not include prisoner holding cells, so they were used for Civil Court cases instead of criminal cases. By 1993, the Department of Citywide Administrative Services had restored the ninth floor for the probation department. The old New York Life Building continued to physically deteriorate through the 1990s, as many of the interior spaces had been covered with linoleum, divided by partitions, and marked by graffiti. The city's general services commissioner, William J. Diamond, said that 346 Broadway was one of the few city-owned buildings that could be feasibly converted into a private development. The interior spaces continued to be publicly accessible in the 2000s, although the clock tower was only accessible on Wednesdays. The probation department and summons court remained at the building until the early 2010s.

=== Residential use ===
The Peebles Corporation, along with its partner El-Ad Group, bought the former New York Life Building from the city for $160 million in 2013; this was part of a $250 million deal that also involved the sale of 49 Chambers to the Chetrit Group. The New York City government sold the buildings in an attempt to reduce the amount of office space that it owned. Peebles finalized its acquisition in December 2013; it was the most expensive property to be sold by the New York City government. 346 Broadway was Peebles's first property in New York City. The Clocktower Gallery closed that year. Immediately after buying the building, Peebles and El-Ad announced they would convert the building into luxury residences. As part of the project, the building would contain either 130 or 140 residences.

==== Planning and legal issues ====
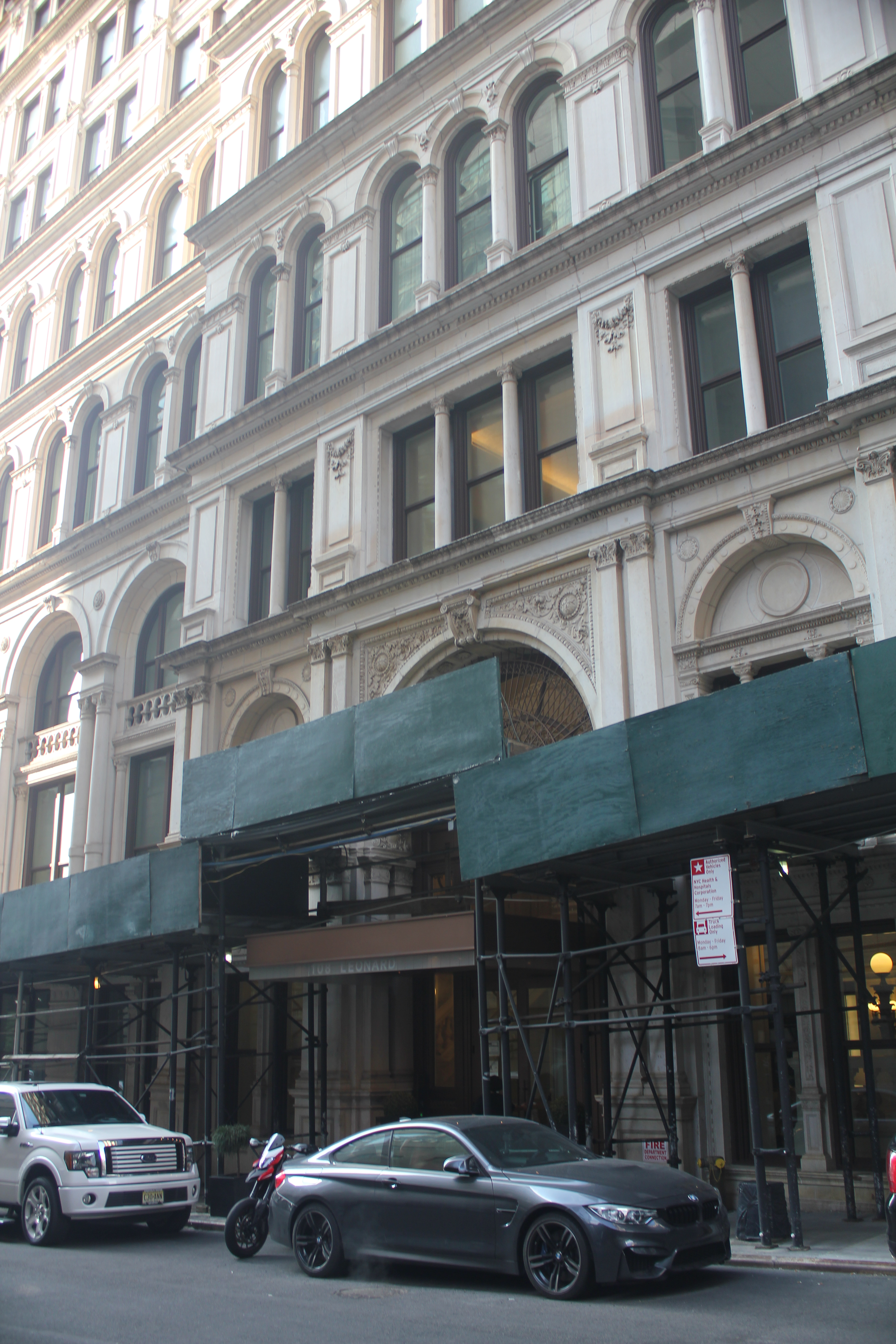
Main residential entrance on Leonard Street

John H. Beyer of architectural firm Beyer Blinder Belle proposed relocating the building's staircases, adding two penthouses, and removing fire escapes to make way for private balconies. The developers planned to convert the publicly accessible clock tower into a private residence, and they wished to replace the clock's mechanical workings with electric machinery; the developers shut off electricity to the clock in May 2014. The building was originally supposed to contain a hotel, plans for which had been scrapped by July 2014. The development also had to include a 16,000 ft^{2} (1,500 m^{2}) community space; by October 2014, local residents were expressing concerns that the developers were trying to downsize the community space. The LPC voted in December 2014 to grant a "certificate of appropriateness" to the clock tower's conversion, despite public opposition to that part of the project. Schneider continued to visit the building every week to wind the clock until March 2015, when the developers stopped granting him access to the clock tower.

Negotiations over aspects of the design continued for several months. The city had temporarily leased back some space for the summons court and probation department, but the lease ran only until October 2015. Initially, the city government had intended to relocate the summons court to another building in Tribeca, prompting a lawsuit from local residents and organizations. The probation department relocated from 346 Broadway to the Financial District in January 2014, despite local opposition to that move. The city eventually dropped its original plan to relocate the summons court within Tribeca, and the court remained at 346 Broadway for another year, delaying the residential conversion project. The summons court ultimately moved to the Municipal Building in early 2015.

The developers also faced several legal challenges. In late 2015, minority developer Dan Hoeg sued Peebles, claiming that the firm had refused to give him 25 percent of the project's profit as part of an agreement with Peebles. Peebles denied that Hoeg had any equity stake in the building, and he countersued the next year. former Peebles executive Daniel Newhouse had also sued Peebles for a stake in 346 Broadway's profits, but Newhouse withdrew his suit in 2015. Preservationists sued in the New York Supreme Court, the trial-level court of New York state, to prevent the conversion of the clock tower into a private residence. The Supreme Court revoked the LPC's certificate of appropriateness in March 2016, despite the city government's own assertion that the building's owners did not have to maintain the clock. Peebles and El-Ad also had an issue with an appraiser when Peebles sought to have El-Ad buy out his stake in the project. A panel of state judges upheld the Supreme Court's ruling in November 2017. Peebles and El-Ad developers also sued each other the same year, accusing each other of trying to derail the project. If the developers did not sell at least 35 apartments by August 2018, the city could take back ownership of the building. By November 2017, Peebles and El-Ad had resolved their legal disputes.

==== Renovation and completion ====
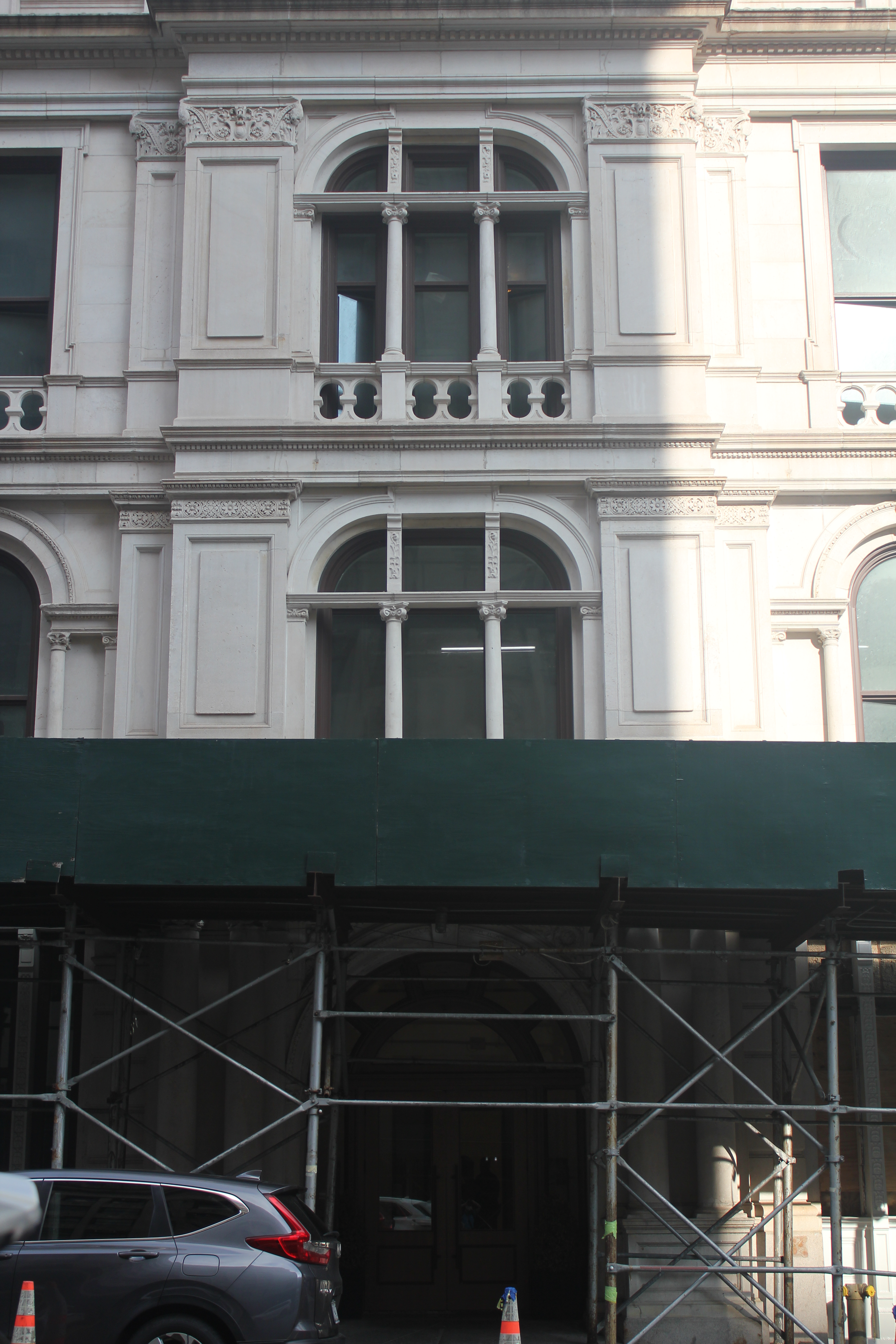
Secondary entrance on Lafayette Street

Bank of America gave the owners a $334 million construction loan in January 2016, and Apollo Commercial Real Estate Finance placed a $77 million mezzanine loan on the project the next month. Architectural firm Howard L. Zimmerman Architects restored the building's facade. The work included cleaning the marble, replacing damaged portions of the roof parapet, and restoring the 7,000-pound sculptural eagles perched on the roof. Afterward, Jeffrey Beers International renovated the building's interior. A residential entrance was built on Leonard Street, and the building was rebranded as 108 Leonard. The building's owners started selling apartments in March 2018, with the cheapest apartments being marketed at $1.5 million. Due to the disputes over the clock tower, the developers postponed plans to build a penthouse apartment in the clark tower.

The New York Court of Appeals, the highest court in New York state, reversed the New York Supreme Court's ruling on the clock-tower lawsuit in early 2019, finding that the owners could close the clock tower and convert it into an apartment. The Court of Appeals' ruling effectively ended the legal dispute, to preservationists' disappointment, and the penthouse was placed on sale in 2024. Peebles and El-Ad refinanced the building in September 2019 with $450 million from Mack Real Estate Credit Strategies. Among the building's early residents were singer Keith Urban and actress Nicole Kidman; singer Sabrina Carpenter; Alexandra Clancy, the widow of writer Tom Clancy; and actor Hugh Jackman. The music executive Clive Davis bought an apartment in the building but sold it in 2023 without having lived there.

In early 2022, JPMorgan Chase and Lionheart Management provided a $229.4 million mortgage loan for the project. Jack Shainman, operator of the Jack Shainman Gallery, announced in November 2022 that he would open a 20,000-square-foot (1,900 m^{2}) gallery within 108 Leonard's banking hall in late 2023. Shainman had paid $20 million for the banking hall and was planning to spend $3 million to $4 million on renovations. The Jack Shainman Gallery soft opened in the building in January 2024. That March, VIQ Architecture submitted plans to the LPC for alterations to the banking hall's interior, as well as the lower portions of the facade on Leonard Street and Lafayette Street.

== Reception ==
When the western part of the building was completed, the New-York Tribune wrote in 1893: "It is a pity that the clock tower which surmounts the building [...] should be so high above the range of vision of passers-by in the street." Architectural critic Francis Swales said that, although the building's facade was composed similarly to nearby loft buildings because of the use of repeating motifs, "The objections are, however, unsatisfactory [...] Externally—and internally as far as least as the splendid banking-room and vestibules are concerned—it is the perfection of detail that captures one." Christopher Gray of The New York Times wrote in 1993 that the general office was "rich and Roman, on a scale of interiors like those at the University and Metropolitan Clubs". The 2010 edition of the AIA Guide to New York City characterized the structure's clock as a "wonderful Classical clock overlooking Broadway."

The writer Eliot Gregory did not like the decorations atop the clock tower, writing in 1899 that the decorations resembled "a monument in Greenwood (Cemetery), surmounted by a rat trap". The Architectural Review felt the cornices to be unsatisfactory because it gave the appearance of multiple shorter buildings stacked atop each other, with no clear horizontal division of base, shaft, and capital. When Gray described the rundown building in a Times article in 1993, he said that the Leonard Street lobby contained "the tackiest fake-veneer candy stand left in the city, complete with Beirut-style rolldown steel gates". Although general services commissioner Kenneth J. Knuckles complained about Gray's article, Knuckles also did not dispute any of the details mentioned in the article.

== See also ==
- List of New York City Designated Landmarks in Manhattan below 14th Street
- National Register of Historic Places listings in Manhattan below 14th Street
- Robbins & Appleton Building (also designed by Stephen D. Hatch)
