= New York Life Building =

Office skyscraper in Manhattan, New York

- U.S. National Register of Historic Places
- U.S. National Historic Landmark
- New York State Register of Historic Places
- New York City Landmark
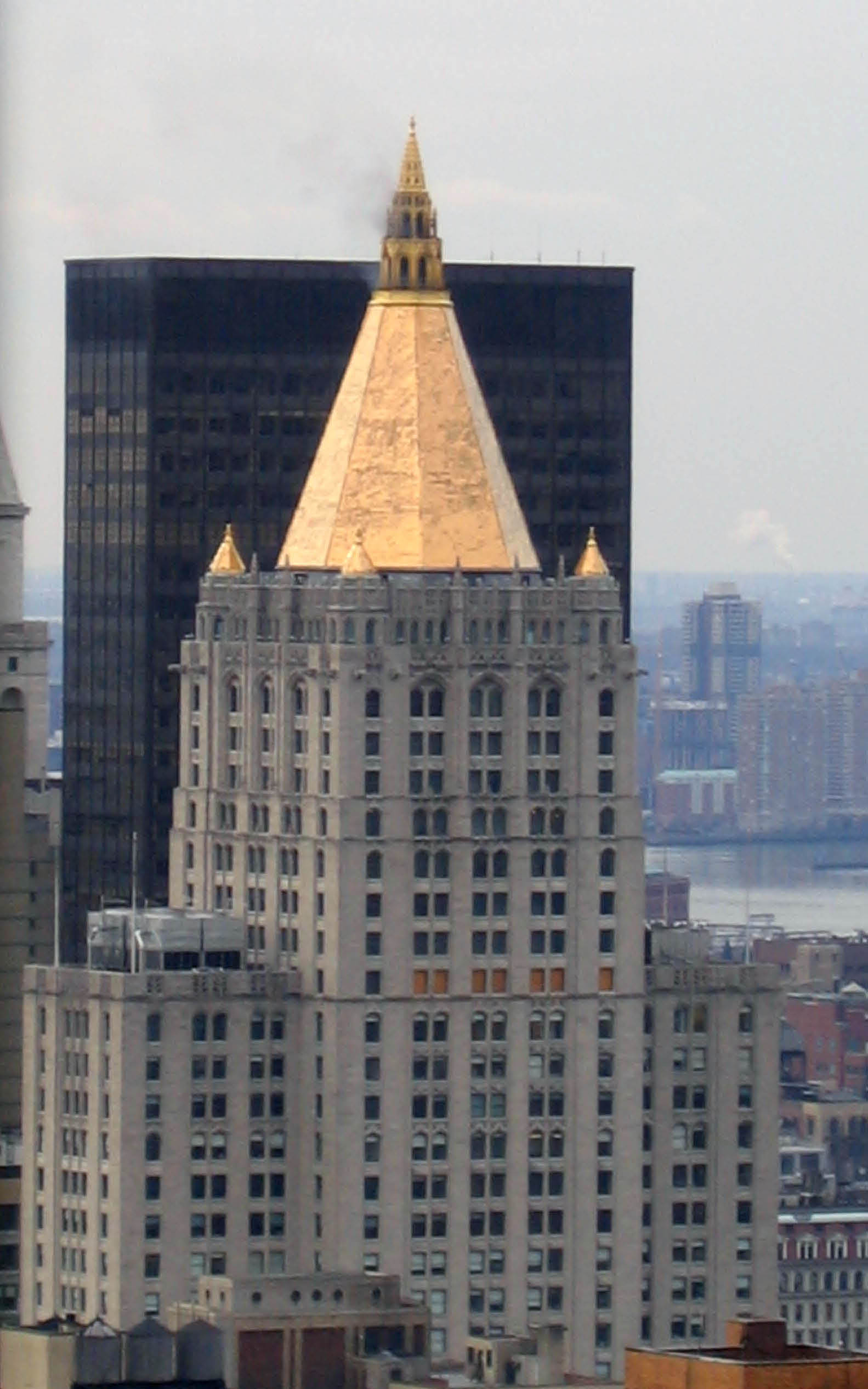
- Location: 51 Madison Avenue, Manhattan, New York
- Coordinates: 40°44′34″N 73°59′08″W
- Area: 2.5 acres (1.0 ha)
- Built: 1927–1928
- Architect: Cass Gilbert
- Architectural style: Gothic Revival
- NRHP reference No.: 78001876
- NYSRHP No.: 06101.001754
- NYCL No.: 2067

Significant dates
- Added to NRHP: June 2, 1978
- Designated NHL: June 2, 1978
- Designated NYSRHP: June 23, 1980
- Designated NYCL: October 2, 2000

The New York Life Building, also known as 51 Madison, is the headquarters of the New York Life Insurance Company at 51 Madison Avenue in the Rose Hill and NoMad neighborhoods of Manhattan in New York City. The building, designed by Cass Gilbert, abuts Madison Square Park and occupies an entire city block bounded by Madison Avenue, Park Avenue South, and 26th and 27th Streets.

The New York Life Building was designed with Gothic Revival details similar to Gilbert's previous commissions, including 90 West Street and the Woolworth Building. The tower is 615 feet (187 m) tall (the equivalent of forty stories), consisting of 34 office stories topped by a pyramidal, gilded six-story roof. At the time of the building's construction, many structures were being built in the Art Deco style, and so Gilbert's design incorporated Art Deco influences in its massing while retaining the older-style Gothic Revival detailing. The New York Life Building is distinguished from the skyline by its gilded roof.

The New York Life Building was constructed in 1927–1928 on the site of Madison Square Garden. Upon completion, the New York Life Building was described as being run "like a small city". After World War II, New York Life became especially profitable, and built an annex to the north between 1960 and 1962. Additionally, New York Life completed a series of renovations to the original building during the late 20th century. The building was added to the National Register of Historic Places as a National Historic Landmark in 1978 and was designated a city landmark by the New York City Landmarks Preservation Commission in 2000.

== Architecture ==
Designed in 1926 by Cass Gilbert, the New York Life Building was the last significant Gilbert skyscraper in Manhattan. The New York Life Building was also the last major insurance company "home office" to be built in New York City, and one of the few such structures remaining in the city. (Note: The others include: Former New York Life Insurance Company Building at 346 Broadway; Home Life Insurance Company Building at 256 Broadway; Metropolitan Life Insurance Company Tower at 1 Madison Avenue, three blocks south; Germania Life Building at 50 Union Square East; Equitable Building at 120 Broadway) Its design was inspired by Salisbury Cathedral, although Gilbert also said that he took inspiration from some of his previous commissions, including 90 West Street and the Woolworth Building. The building was designed for the New York Life Insurance Company for three main reasons: to provide expansion space, as an investment, and as an icon.

The building occupies the full block between 26th Street, 27th Street, Madison Avenue and Park Avenue South. The lot measures 200 by 425 feet (61 by 130 m), with the longer axis running west–east. The New York Life Building stands 615 feet (187 m) tall and contains 34 floors, though is technically 40 stories high. In addition to a ground-level retail area, there are five basement levels, a first-floor mezzanine, 33 above-ground office stories, and six mechanical stories in the roof. The structure has been described as being one of the brightest in the city, with a total wattage of 30,000 watts.

=== Form ===
The New York Life Building combines streamlined Gothic details and a massing that is distinctly Moderne in design. The massing contains several setbacks as mandated under the 1916 Zoning Resolution. The setbacks are located at the 5th, 14th, 26th, 30th, 31st, 34th, and 35th floors, while the roof rises from the 35th-floor setback. The massing does not fill the entire zoning envelope, but the slenderness of the upper floors allowed for fewer elevators to be used, thus opening up additional space on lower floors.

The lowest four stories, including the mezzanine, comprise the base, while the fifth through 13th floors comprise the building's nine-story "central section". The building's 21-story "tower" section rises from the 14th to 34th floors. Between the 14th and 25th floors, the "tower" is flanked by wings to the west and east.

=== Facade ===
The facade is made of granite at the base, while the other stories are faced with limestone. The building contains 2,180 windows, most of them plate glass panes. Most of the windows are one-over-one sash windows with one of four lintel types, though the 34th floor contains single-pane windows that replaced the louvered or empty openings on that level. The windows originally all contained bronze frames. There are several ventilation intake openings on the facade of the building; the artificial ventilation initially had its intake in the basement and was exhausted through the penthouse. Numerous signs are also affixed to the building, including bronze company nameplates at the corners, signs for the subway on the eastern facade, and awnings on the storefront.

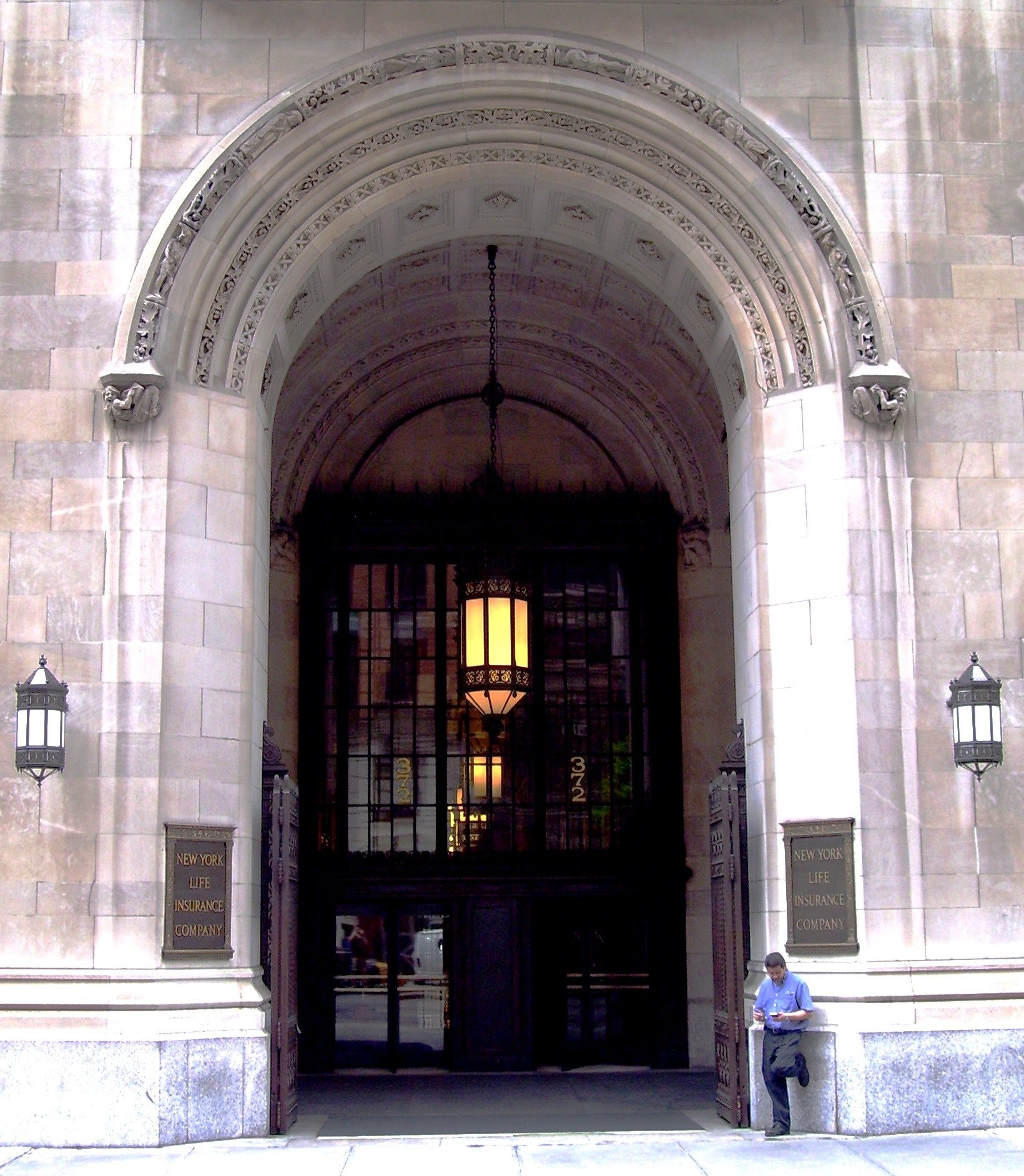
Park Avenue entrance

At ground level, all four sides contain arched double-height arcades that overlook the ground floor and the first-floor mezzanine. On the ground floor, there are storefronts with bronze display window frames above granite bulkheads, optionally with a transom; several of the storefronts have revolving doors with transoms. Some of the original storefronts have been modified. The arcades on the Madison Avenue and Park Avenue South facades each have nine vertical bays, while the 26th and 27th Street facades have 19 bays. Each bay corresponds to one arch of the arcade. The main entrance archway is from Madison Avenue to the west, flanked by smaller arches on either side. There is also a smaller entrance from Park Avenue South. On the second through fourth floors, there are decorative spandrel panels between the windows on each floor.

The central section of the building comprises the 5th through 13th floors. the windows on each floor are separated by decorative spandrels, while each bay is separated by protruding piers. There are other decorative elements such as gargoyles and a parapet on the 13th floor, and flagpoles on the 14th floor. The central section consists of seven bays on Madison Avenue and Park Avenue South, and seventeen bays on 26th and 27th Streets.

The square tower rises above the 14th floor and consists of five bays on either side. The wings to the west and east, which rise to the 25th floor, have three bays on either side. The west and east walls of the tower between the 14th and 25th floors, which are mostly hidden by the "wings", each have one window bay to the north and south, flanking the respective wings. There are minimal setbacks at the 30th and 31st floors. As with the central section, there are protruding piers separating each bay, as well as other decorative elements.

The octagonal pyramidal roof at the top is 88 feet (27 m) tall and includes the 35th through 40th stories. The 35th floor is slightly set back from the 34th floor; it contains arched window openings, finials between each window bay, and a parapet. The roof itself consists of 25,000 gold-leaf dipped clay roof tiles produced by Ludowici, with a fineness of 22 karats. The roof was originally gold leaf on a copper base, but due to copper corrosion, the roof was subsequently renovated in 1967 and 1995. At the top, a lantern rises another 57 feet (17 m) and serves as the ventilation outflow.

=== Interior ===
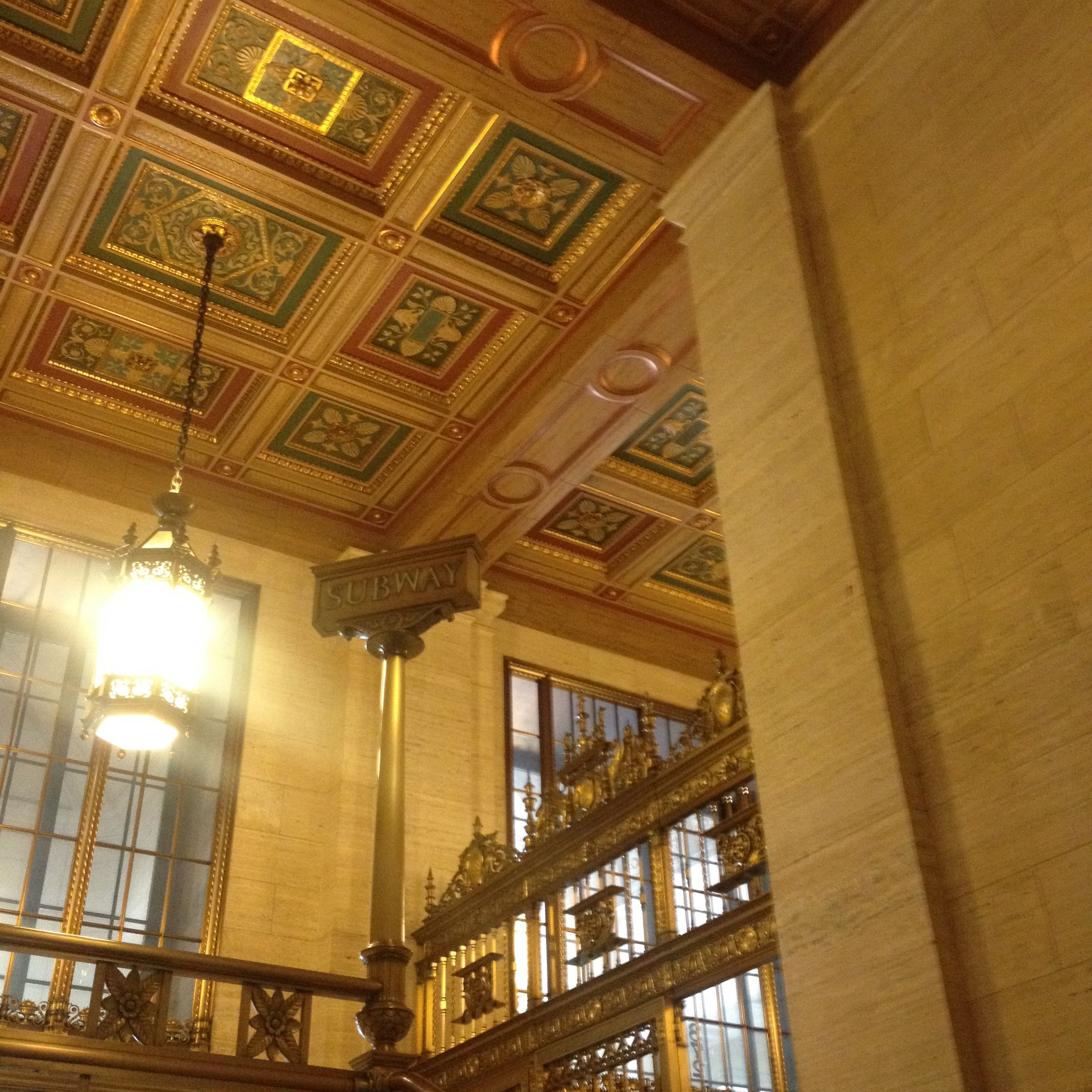
Subway entrance inside the building

Inside the New York Life Building is a large lobby running west–east for 400 feet (120 m), the entire length of the building. The lobby is designed similar to the nave of a cathedral, with travertine walls, a painted coffer ceiling with barrel vaults 38 feet (12 m) tall, as well as bronze ornamental grilles on doorways and elevators. Perpendicular to the lobby are a pair of passages running north and south to 27th and 26th Streets respectively, providing six entrances from the surrounding streets.

There are five basement levels, extending 87 feet (27 m) below ground level. The eastern side of the first basement level incorporates an entrance to the downtown platform of the New York City Subway's 28th Street station, serving the 6 and <6> trains. Another basement contains a vault developed in conjunction with engineers from the Federal Reserve Bank of New York and the United States Department of the Treasury. The vault contained features such as a time lock, an 800-pound (360 kg) steel door, and some 80 miles (130 km) of wiring for the alarms. The other basements include service facilities, restaurants, and storage for the company's documents.

The rest of the interior is relatively unadorned, with a few exceptions. The executive offices contain wooden paneling and the premium deposit room contains a marble floor. In addition, the company's 48-by-25-foot (14.6 by 7.6 m) boardroom was moved over from the former 346 Broadway headquarters; this relocation had included all of the boardroom's furnishings, including the English brown oak paneling, tapestries, and windows. The clerical department was located on the second through fifth floors and contained the largest pneumatic tube system in the United States at the building's completion. In the original design, the interior spaces were heavily soundproofed with thick glass panes, acoustic ceilings, and forced ventilation. The original ornamentation in the other rooms was removed or scaled down in subsequent renovations.

== History ==
Madison Square Park, a 7-acre (2.8 ha) green space diagonally across from the building to the southwest, was opened in 1844. The space was used extensively for cultural and military events, and Madison Avenue on the park's eastern border became an upscale residential row. The site of the New York Life Building was used between 1837 and 1871 as the Union Depot of the New York & Harlem and the New York & New Haven Railroads (now part of the Park Avenue main line). The location then hosted a concert garden named Gilmore's Garden, as well as P.T. Barnum's Hippodrome. The first Madison Square Garden (MSG) was built in 1879 on the northeast corner of Madison Avenue and 26th Street, and was replaced in 1890 by the second Madison Square Garden.

The New York Life Insurance Company had been chartered in 1841 and was originally located in the Financial District of lower Manhattan. Its previous structures in New York City had been clustered around lower Manhattan, including 346 Broadway (erected 1870), (Note: 346 Broadway had been built in 1870 and further expanded in the 1890s.) though New York Life also built branches in other cities around the world. New York Life took up the mortgage of MSG in 1912, and bought the facility outright four years later, when the venue went bankrupt.

=== Planning and construction ===
==== Planning ====
New York Life first commissioned Cass Gilbert in 1919 to draw plans for a possible new skyscraper on the MSG site, having chosen Gilbert due to his reputation for creating designs that expressed discrete corporate identities. Gilbert proposed two plans for a tall tower: one with a high base and light courts, and the other with a lower base; however, neither was pursued further at the time. According to a New York Life archivist, there remained no copies of Gilbert's plans. At the time, life insurance companies generally had their own buildings for their offices and branch locations. According to architectural writer Kenneth Gibbs, these buildings allowed each individual company to instill "not only its name but also a favorable impression of its operations" in the general public. This had been a trend since 1870, with the completion of the former Equitable Life Building in Manhattan's Financial District. Furthermore, life insurance companies of the late 19th and early 20th centuries generally built massive buildings to fit their large clerical and records-keeping staff.

By the 1920s, New York Life was undergoing another period of rapid growth, and operations could no longer fit in the 346 Broadway building. The company formed a committee in 1923 to determine whether a new headquarters could feasibly be constructed on the MSG site, and by the end of that year, the committee concluded that such construction was possible. Additional sites were considered and rejected. (Note: These included the "Spanish Flats" at Central Park South and Seventh Avenue, which was the same size as the MSG site. However, the area was zoned only for residential use at the time, and New York Life determined the Spanish Flats site to be too difficult to acquire, and it was redeveloped for apartments instead.) The MSG site had previously been considered for the site of the Convocation Tower, a 1,001-foot (305 m), 80-story tower proposed in 1921 by architect Bertram Grosvenor Goodhue, which would have been designed in a Gothic-inspired style.

In February 1924, Gilbert proposed a 28-story structure to the company's board of directors. Two months later, the architect proposed a structure with a 21-story base and a 2-story, 50-foot (15 m) tower. The board submitted "tentative plans" to the New York City Department of Buildings in May 1924. The plans were slightly changed from Gilbert's original: the tower was expanded to seven stories, and the setbacks and light courts were minimized. The structure would also feature a north–south passageway and east–west lobby; five basement stories, including a subway entrance on the highest basement; and retail space at ground level, facing both inside and outside. Gilbert and the board of directors also considered other designs throughout the rest of 1924.

==== Construction ====
All leases at MSG were set to expire in May 1925. Demolition of MSG began at that time, and work on the foundation began in August 1925, after the old structure had been demolished. The directors had considered retaining some portions of the MSG structure, such as the Diana sculpture, but this was deemed infeasible. The erection of the New York Life Building's steelwork began in January 1926. Gunvald Aus was selected as the structural engineer and the Starrett Brothers as general contractor.

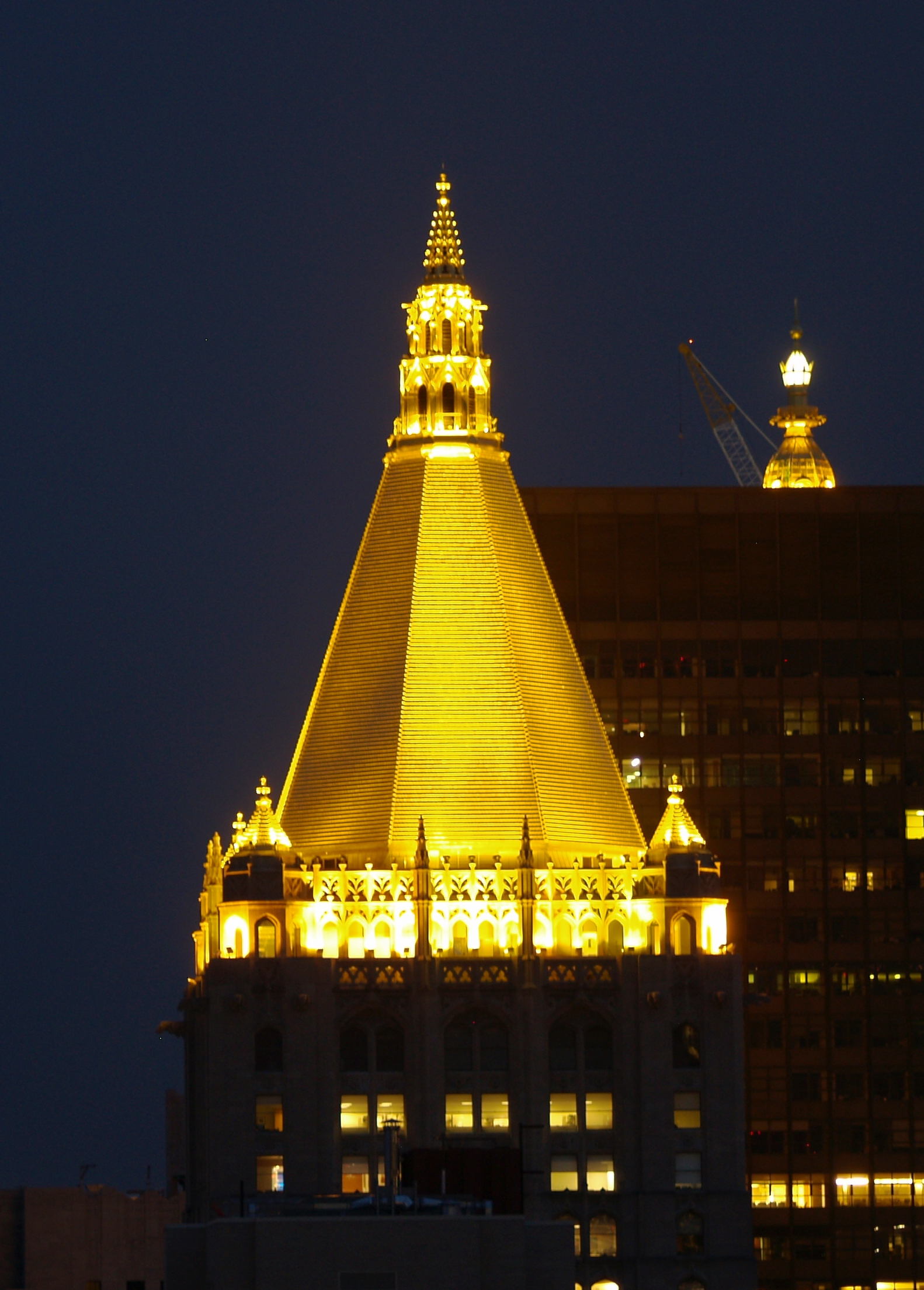
The building's roof from the north

Builder Paul Starrett of the Starrett Brothers, whose opinion New York Life's board had asked, had seen Gilbert's tentative plan as an "unlighted, unrelieved box of a building". In mid-1926, Starrett convinced New York Life to cancel an existing steel order for the project, and asked Yasuo Matsui, an associate in his company, the Starrett Brothers, to come up with a new plan. Within 48 hours, Matsui submitted his revised plans. At the time, some $1 million had been spent and work was partially complete. The remaining cost of construction had been deemed too expensive; excessive ventilation and artificial lighting systems would have been needed due to the lack of light courts, making it difficult for the space to be profitable as originally planned. Such concerns had been expressed by the state's Insurance Department, as well as by Starrett. In August 1926, a new plan was released for a 34-story limestone structure with setbacks, a pyramidal roof, and a Gothic design inspired by French and Dutch architecture. The foundation excavation was completed that month. By then, Gilbert had lost interest in the construction process, and his office was "simply approving or disapproving [...] Starrett Brothers' decisions, largely without comment" by 1927.

The ceremonial cornerstone, laid in June 1927, was filled with documents such as a copy of The New York Times and various company-related reports. New York Life started to move into the 51 Madison Avenue building in November 1928. During that month New York Life transferred 75 million documents representing $6.85 billion in policies to the new building. An additional $675 million in securities was transported to the new structure, protected by 100 armored cars with machine guns. The New York Life Building at 51 Madison Avenue was officially opened on December 12, 1928, when U.S. president Calvin Coolidge, a board member of New York Life, pressed a button at the White House. The structure had been completed at an ultimate cost of $23.35 million; of this, the land cost $2.35 million and the actual construction was $21 million.

=== Use ===
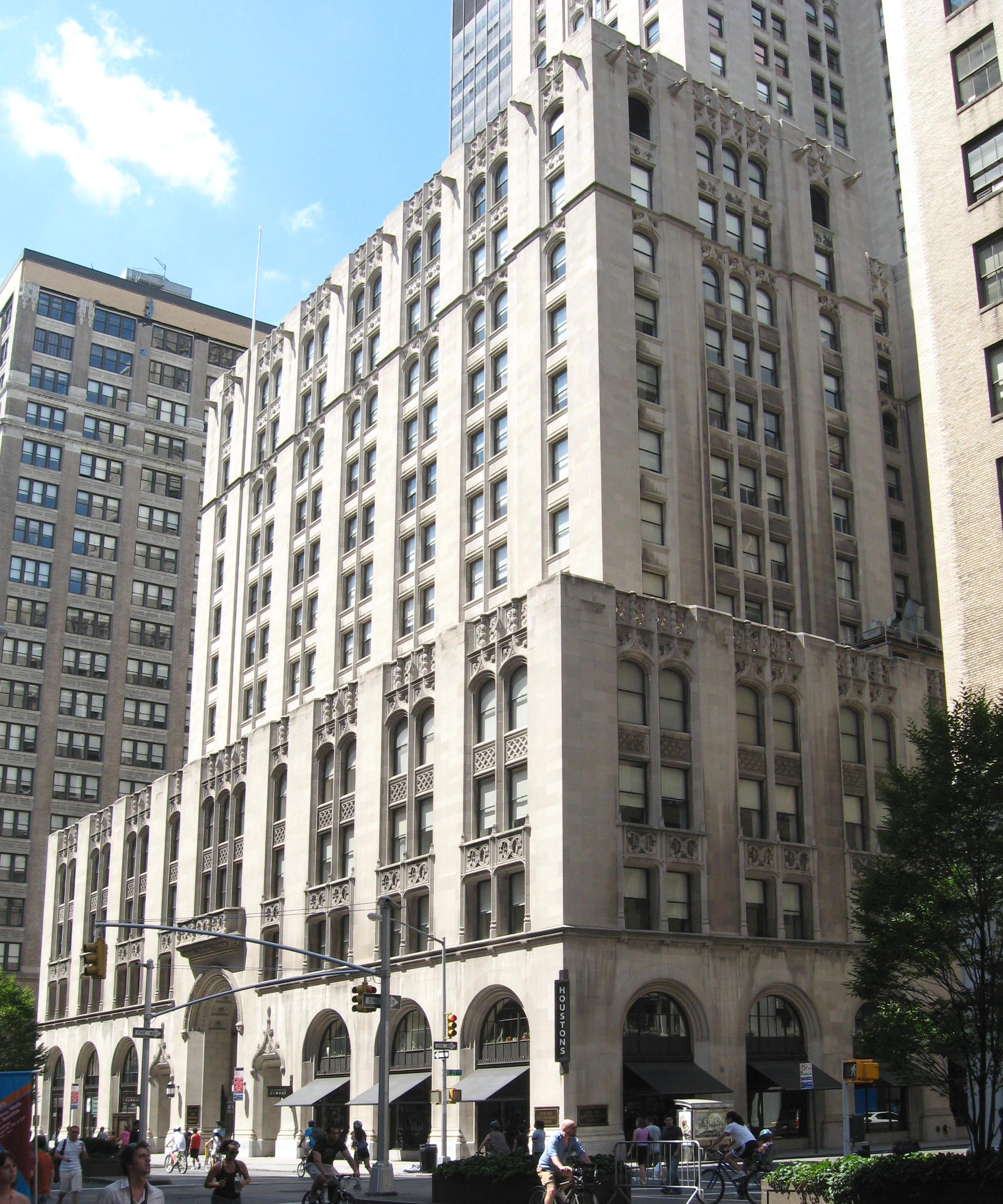
Seen at street level from Park Avenue South and 27th Street

The New York Life Building was described as being run "like a small city": it had a security force of 25 security guards, which doubled as a fire brigade, as well as a cleaning team for the building's several miles of corridors. There was an employee clinic on the 14th floor, a system of 105 fire standpipes, a system of elevators carrying over 50,000 people a day, a mail system that handled 50,000 pieces of mail daily, and even an employee newspaper. New York Life initially only occupied about 65% of the space. The remaining floor area was rented out to other commercial and office tenants, such as wool firms, a drug store, and New York University. For several years, New York Life retained ownership of the Diana statue, finally shipping it to the Philadelphia Museum of Art in 1932.

After World War II, New York Life became especially profitable, being involved in several New York City housing developments. In 1959, New York Life acquired much of the block located immediately to the north, between 27th and 28th Streets, and submitted plans to the Department of Buildings for a 16-story building on the site, to be located at 63 Madison Avenue. Carson & Lundin designed the annex while Turner Construction was the contractor. Construction began in August 1960, and despite a major fire in early 1962, was completed later that year. Upon the annex's completion, it became known as the "North Building", while the older 51 Madison Avenue building was called the "South Building".

New York Life also completed a series of renovations during the late 20th century. In 1956, part of the roof was repaired as an interim measure. The entire roof of the building's tower section was replaced in 1966–1967, and most of the stonework on the 35th-floor stone facade was removed. As part of the renovation, Carson, Lundin & Shaw replaced the gilded copper roof with gilded ceramic tiles, rearranged the structural steel holding up the roof, and extended the roof's slope downward. Several other projects involved adding air conditioning and fluorescent lighting to the interior, upgrading the elevators, and using alternating current rather than direct current for electricity. Some of the original interior decor was stripped in the process.

In 1985, to celebrate New York Life's 140th anniversary, a 617-foot-high (188 m) artificial candle was lit at the top of the pyramid. Other upgrades during the 1980s and 1990s included mechanical equipment on the setback of the 14th floor; new roofs above the setbacks on the 26th, 34th, and 35th floors; and cooling equipment on the western setback of the 26th floor. For New York Life's 150th anniversary, in 1994–1995 the pyramid was restored with new tiles and lit at a cost of $4.1 million. The New York Life Insurance Company continued to maintain its headquarters in the building, but started leasing extra office space through Cushman and Wakefield in 2004.

== Impact ==
=== Reception ===
At opening, New York Life president Darwin P. Kingsley described the structure as "a majestic cathedral of insurance". Miriam Berman, a historian, described the gold-plated roof as one "that catches and reflects the sunlight by day and by night is one of the more easily recognized shapes on the city's illuminated skyline". In February 1929, the Fifth Avenue Association dubbed the structure as the "finest commercial building" erected around Fifth Avenue in 1928. Claude Fayette Bragdon said in 1931 that the design "attempted to reconcile the original Gothic ideals of the skyscraper [...] and the newer ideal which relies less upon surface and finial ornament and more upon the arrangement of cubic masses." George Shepard Chappell, writing in The New Yorker under the pseudonym "T-Square", said that Gilbert had been "allowed the luxury of a definite 'style'" and considered the sparing ornamentation to be "decidedly refreshing". Robert A. M. Stern, in his book New York 1930, said that even as the building "was remarkably simplified by comparison with Gilbert's previous works, it was also more stolid".

A plaque outside the building, installed by the New York Landmarks Preservation Foundation, describes it as "a powerful example of corporate architecture, symbolizing the New York Life Insurance Company’s financial strength and stability". The National Park Service said that 51 Madison Avenue was "an excellently maintained example of Cass Gilbert's work" whose plans "best represents the large, well-structured organization of the New York Life Insurance Company" in its heyday. This was contrasted with the former Broadway headquarters, which were described as not being among the best work of its respective designer, McKim, Mead & White. The New York City Landmarks Preservation Commission called the structure "a powerful symbol" of New York Life's "public spiritedness, lasting stability, and financial success." After the 1995 renovation, the building received a Merit Citation Award from the New York Landmarks Conservancy.

Not all critics appraised the building positively. The WPA Guide to New York City compared the New York Life Building to the Woolworth Building: "Although the Gothic ornament [of the New York Life Building] is similar to that of the Woolworth Building, it lacks the powerful upward movement embodied in the latter." Charles Phelps Cushing wrote that the gilded roof resembled an "inverted ice cream cone, of golden brown pastry, stamped in the Nabisco pattern".

=== Landmark designations ===
The building was listed in the National Register of Historic Places as a National Historic Landmark in 1972. The New York Life Building was designated an official New York City landmark by the city's Landmarks Preservation Commission in 2000. At the time, The New York Times said that the building had never been proposed to the commission for designation, despite being "one of New York's most familiar landmarks".

== See also ==
- List of New York City Designated Landmarks in Manhattan from 14th to 59th Streets
- List of National Historic Landmarks in New York City
- List of tallest buildings in New York City
- National Register of Historic Places listings in Manhattan from 14th to 59th Streets
