= 359 Broadway =

Building in Manhattan, New York

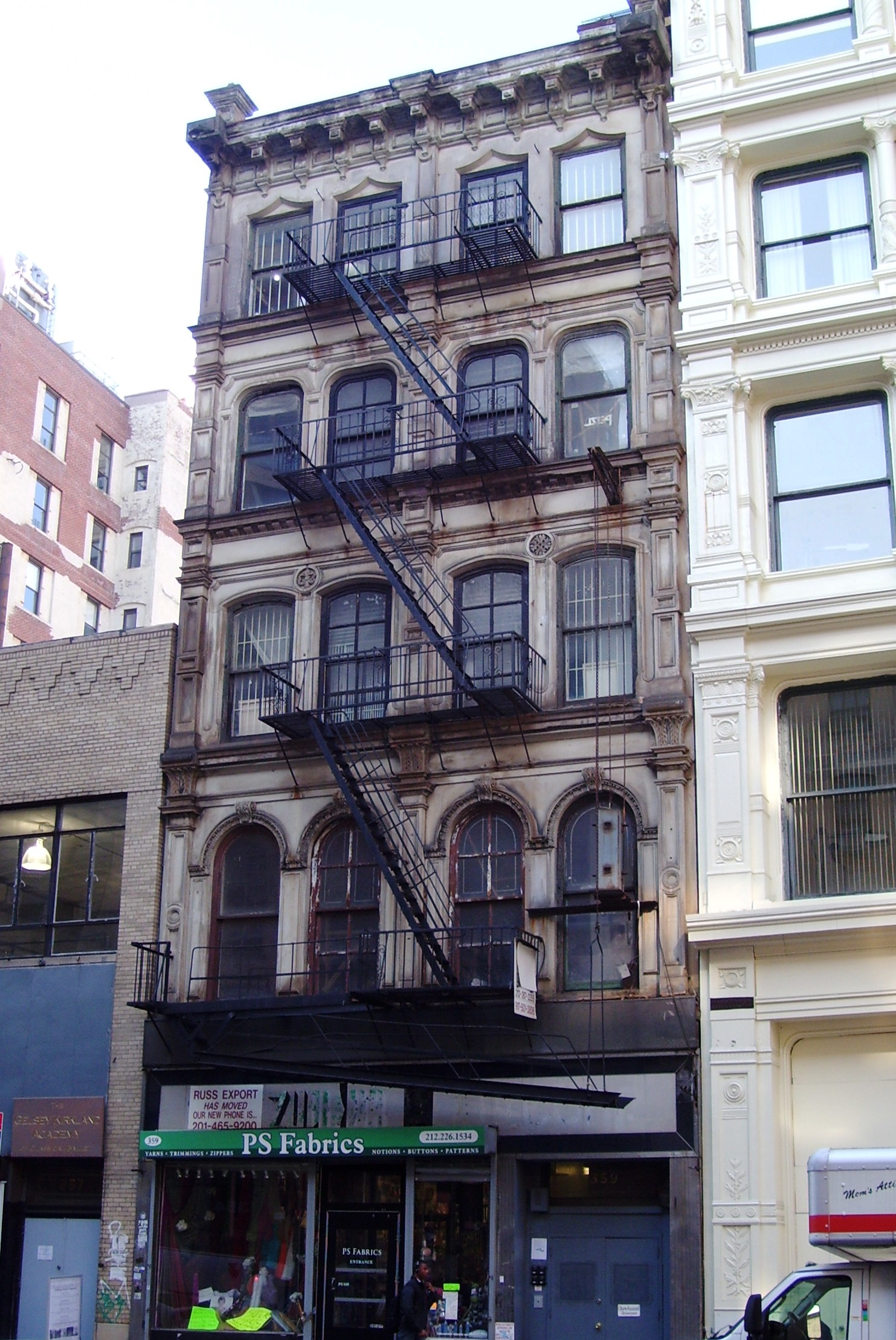
- (2012)

- Location within New York City

General information
- Architectural style: Italianate
- Location: Manhattan, New York City, 359 Broadway
- Coordinates: 40.71736°N 74.00412°W
- Completed: 1852

Height
- Height: 55.38 ft (16.88 m)

Technical details
- Floor count: 5

Design and construction
- Architecture firm: Field & Correja

New York City Landmark
- Designated: October 16, 1990
- Reference no.: 1758

359 Broadway is a building on the west side of Broadway between Leonard and Franklin Streets in the Tribeca neighborhood of Manhattan, New York City. It was built in 1852 and was designed by the firm of Field & Correja in the Italianate style.

The top three floors of the building were used by pioneering photographer Mathew Brady as a portrait studio from 1853 to 1859, where he photographed many famous Americans. On the south side of the building a faded painted sign for Mathew Brady's Studio could once be seen by pedestrians on Broadway, but this was painted over before 1990.

The building was purchased by brothers Mark Tennenbaum and Emil Tanner and their brother-in-law Leo Beller in 1943. The partners operated a textile wholesale business from which they retired in the early 1970s, and the building was subsequently sold.

The building was made a New York City designated landmark in 1990, an action which was confirmed in 1992 after a long battle between the city and its owner. Justice Karla Moskowitz of the New York State Supreme Court decided in April that it was "clear that the building was considered from the first on architectural as well as historical grounds." The New York City Landmarks Preservation Commission had argued for the building's preservation, both because of its famous tenant – Brady – and the fact that each of the building's five floors had received a distinctive window treatment, thus indicating that it was an architecturally significant structure and not merely a utilitarian structure.

== See also ==
- List of New York City Designated Landmarks in Manhattan
