= Robbins & Appleton Building =

Building in Manhattan, New York

- U.S. National Register of Historic Places
- New York State Register of Historic Places
- New York City Landmark
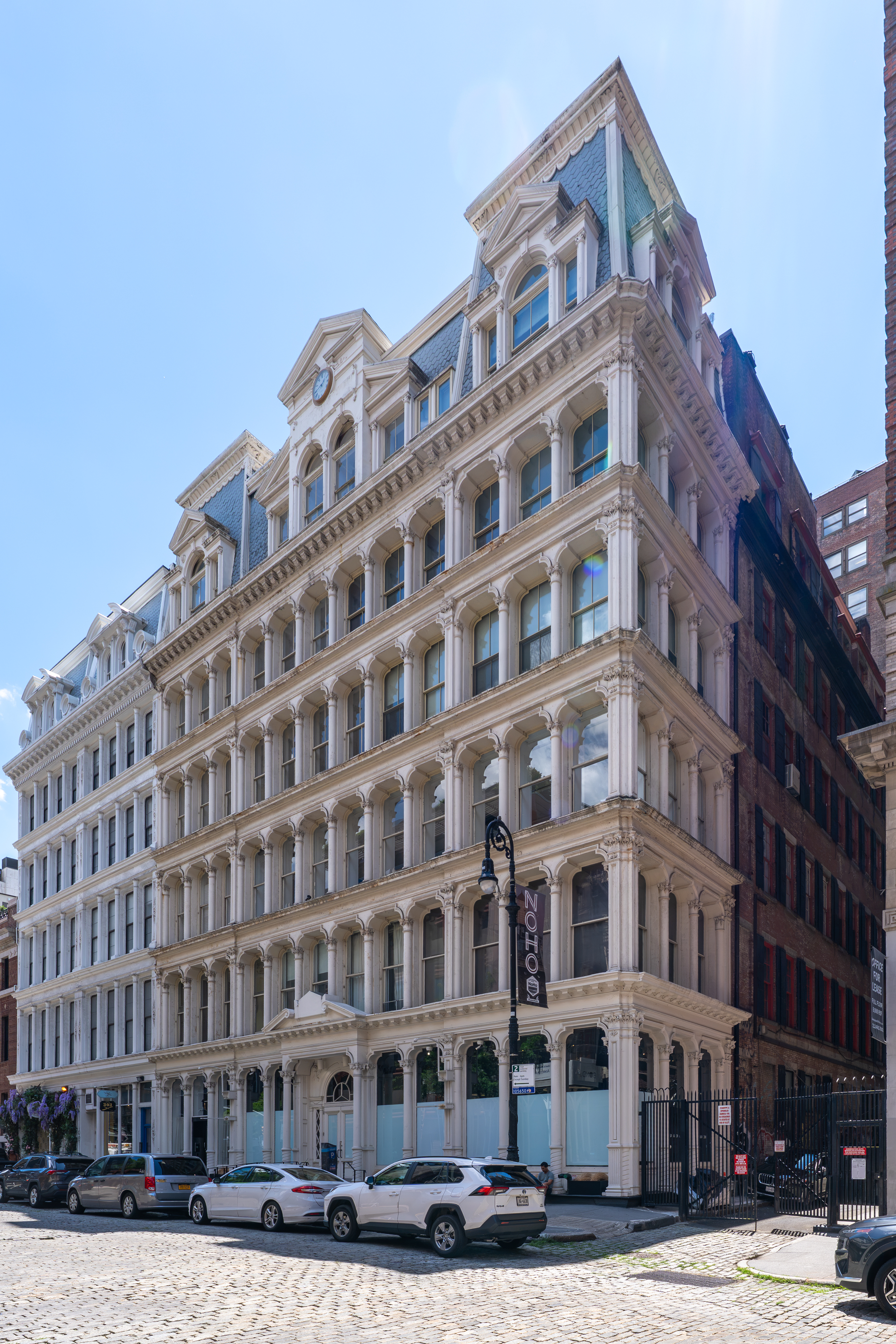
- (2026)

- Location within Lower Manhattan Location within Manhattan Location within New York City Location within New York Location within the United States
- Location: 1-5 Bond St., Manhattan, New York City
- Coordinates: 40°43′36″N 73°59′41″W
- Built: 1879-1880
- Architect: Stephen Decatur Hatch
- Architectural style: Second Empire
- NRHP reference No.: 82001204
- NYSRHP No.: 06101.001761
- NYCL No.: 1038

Significant dates
- Added to NRHP: October 29, 1982
- Designated NYSRHP: September 29, 1982
- Designated NYCL: June 19, 1979

The Robbins & Appleton Building is a historic building at 1–5 Bond Street between Broadway and Lafayette Street in the NoHo neighborhood of Manhattan in New York City. Built in 1879–1880, it was designed by architect Stephen Decatur Hatch in the Second Empire style. The building features an ornate cast iron facade and mansard roof; it was originally used for the manufacture of watch cases and by publisher D. Appleton & Company. It was converted in 1986 to residential use.

The building was designated a New York City landmark in 1979, and was added to the National Register of Historic Places in 1982.

== See also ==
- Appleton Building
- List of New York City Designated Landmarks in Manhattan below 14th Street
- National Register of Historic Places listings in Manhattan below 14th Street
