= Maxwell Social =

Private social club in Manhattan, New York

- Formation: 2020; 6 years ago Opened to members in April 2023
- Founder: David Litwak; Kyle Chaning-Pearce; Joelle Fuchs
- Type: Private social club
- Headquarters: Tribeca, Manhattan, New York, U.S.

Maxwell Social (also known simply as Maxwell) is a private membership social club occupying two floors of the landmarked Fleming Smith Warehouse in the Tribeca neighborhood of Manhattan, New York City. Founded in 2020 by David Litwak, Kyle Chaning-Pearce, and Joelle Fuchs, and opened to members in April 2023, the club is named after Elsa Maxwell, the American gossip columnist and professional hostess known for organizing lavish society gatherings in the early-to-mid twentieth century. Maxwell Social has been covered by outlets including The New Yorker, Elle Decor, Town & Country, and The Wall Street Journal as part of a broader wave of new private social clubs that opened in New York City in the years following the COVID-19 pandemic.

== History ==
David Litwak and Kyle Chaning-Pearce met as students at the University of California, Berkeley, and had separately organized recurring supper clubs and community dinners before founding Maxwell. According to founder interviews, the concept was developed during the COVID-19 pandemic out of a desire to build a members' club oriented around in-person community and shared hosting duties rather than conventional club amenities such as spas or coworking space. The founders have cited the Basque txoko, a members-only gastronomic society built around communal cooking, as an early point of inspiration, alongside the legacy of hostess Elsa Maxwell.

The club opened in Tribeca in April 2023 with an initial capacity of roughly 600 to 700 members. Membership is by application and interview, and new members are grouped into cohorts that meet regularly over their first several months to build community within the larger club.

== Building ==
Maxwell Social is housed in the Fleming Smith Warehouse, a six-story building at the corner of Washington and Watts Streets completed in 1891 and designed by architect Stephen Decatur Hatch in the Romanesque Revival and Neo-Flemish styles. The building was designated a New York City landmark in 1978 and listed on the National Register of Historic Places in 1983. Its interiors include the Grand Room, Garden Room, and Explorer Room, and feature hand-painted wallpaper murals by Gracie Studio depicting scenes from the life of Elsa Maxwell.

== Membership and programming ==
Rather than employing dedicated bartenders and kitchen staff for daily use, Maxwell Social encourages members to cook meals and serve drinks for one another, and members may rent individual liquor lockers on site. Club programming centers on member-organized dinners, recurring weekly and monthly rituals such as a Friday happy hour, and periodic cultural and discussion events. The club has also been used as a private event venue for brands, media companies, and public figures.

== Reception ==
Maxwell Social has been described in the press as part of a resurgence of private social clubs in New York City in the 2020s. The New Yorker profiled the club in a 2023 feature that described its self-hosting model, in which members serve as their own bartenders and cooks, as the club's defining "gimmick." Elle Decor and Town & Country both published features on its interior design and communal ethos following its opening. The Wall Street Journal later cited Maxwell Social in coverage of etiquette-focused programming at private clubs. Coverage has also noted the club's design collaboration with Gracie Studio on murals depicting the club's namesake.

The club has also drawn media attention for cultural celebrations held at the venue. A Diwali celebration held at Maxwell Social on October 3, 2025, drew press attention after The Real Housewives of New York City cast member Jessel Taank spoke with E! News at the event about the show's upcoming season.
