= Fleming Smith Warehouse =

Building in Manhattan, New York

- U.S. National Register of Historic Places
- New York State Register of Historic Places
- New York City Landmark
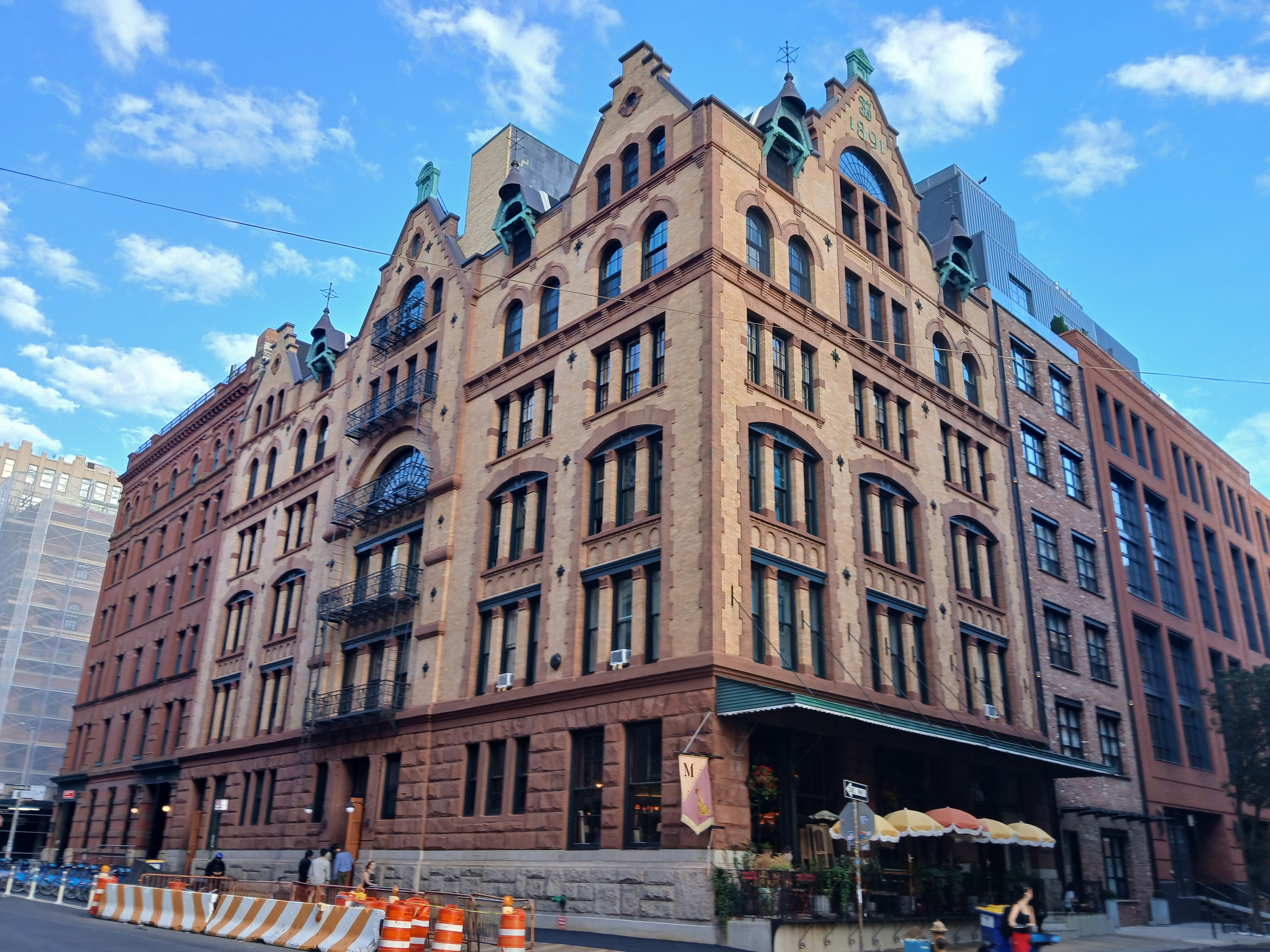

- Location within Lower Manhattan Location within New York City Location within New York Location within the United States
- Location: 451–453 Washington St., Manhattan, New York
- Coordinates: 40°43′26″N 74°00′36″W
- Area: less than one acre
- Built: 1891
- Architect: Stephen Decatur Hatch
- Architectural style: Romanesque, Neo-Flemish
- NRHP reference No.: 83001745
- NYSRHP No.: 06101.001769
- NYCL No.: 0987

Significant dates
- Added to NRHP: 1983-05-26
- Designated NYSRHP: 1983-04-08
- Designated NYCL: 1978-03-14

The Fleming Smith Warehouse is a six-story residential building at 451–453 Washington Street in the Tribeca neighborhood of Manhattan in New York City, New York, United States. Designed by Stephen Decatur Hatch, it combines Romanesque Revival and neo-Flemish architectural elements. The building has a facade clad in rusticated blocks of sandstone, while the rest of the facade is clad in brick; the roof is made of ornate gables. It was originally a warehouse commissioned in 1891 by Fleming Smith, who had previously hired Hatch to design another warehouse in the area. In the 1970s, the building was one of Tribeca's first commercial structures to be renovated into apartments, and the Capsouto family renovated the ground floor into a restaurant. After the Capsouto restaurant closed in 2012, the space became a Chinese restaurant and then a social club.

== Description ==
The Fleming Smith Warehouse is located in the Tribeca neighborhood of Manhattan in New York City. Its address is 451–453 Washington Street and it faces Washington Street to the west and Watts Street to the north. The building is six stories high and has a rectangular plan. Designed by Stephen Decatur Hatch, the structure combines Romanesque Revival and neo-Flemish architectural elements. One writer described the building as "reflect[ing] the care that was put into structures in the late 19th century".

=== Exterior ===
The primary elevation of the facade, on Watts Street, is divided vertically into five bays, of which the center bay protrudes slightly from the others. The secondary elevation, on Washington Street, is three bays wide. The ground story is clad in rusticated blocks of sandstone, while the rest of the facade is clad in brick. On Watts Street, the center bay has the original entrance, while the side bays have recessed windows. On Washington Street, the ground story originally had a loading dock and three wide openings, which were replaced c. 1980 with entrance doors. There are stone piers separating the wide openings, along with a metal canopy protruding above the Washington Street loading-dock openings. There is a cornice above the ground story.

The brick on the upper stories is generally tan, except for red trim. The windows on the second and third stories are surrounded by a single segmental arch in each bay. Many of the original sash windows retain their original six-over-six configurations with wooden mullions. A fire escape extends the height of the Watts Street elevation. The second- and third-story arches consist of red-brick quoins, which flank groupings of three windows per bay on each story. The spandrel panels between the second and third stories' windows have recessed ellipses. In the center bay of the Watts Street elevation, the fourth story is semicircular and is surrounded by concentric brick and stone voussoirs. This window is flanked by a pair of triple-height pilasters, which ascend to a gable above the sixth story. Along the rest of the fourth story, each bay has three flat-arched windows, and brick corbels run horizontally across the facade above that story.

On the fifth story, the central bays of each elevation have flat-arched window openings (four on Watts Street, three on Washington Street). The remaining bays have a pair of round-arched windows on that story, with stone keystones. The top of the building has four gables: three on Watts Street and one on Washington Street. The center gable on Watts Street has a central round arch, two smaller segmental arches flanking it, and an ocular window above the round arch. The other two Watts Street gables have "crow-stepped" profiles. The gable on Washington Street has the original owner's initials inscribed into it, along with a copper finial. The roof also has four iron dormers with copper hoods. Two of the dormers, positioned between the three gables on Watts Street, are ornamented with weathervanes.

== History ==
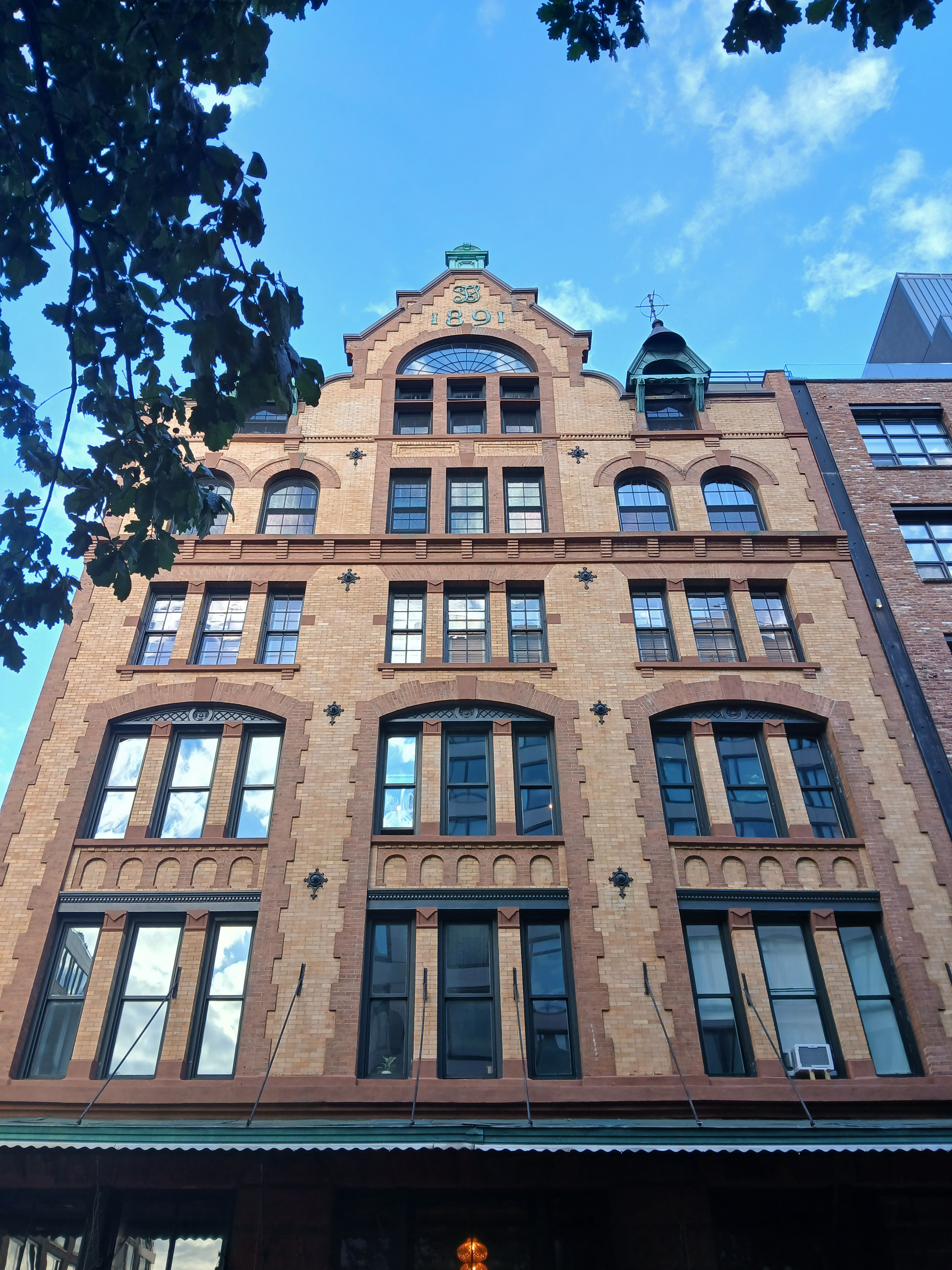
Central gable on Washington Street

The architect Stephen Decatur Hatch was hired in 1886 to design a warehouse along the nearby Duane Park for Fleming Smith. Following this collaboration, Smith again hired Hatch to design the Fleming Smith Warehouse at Watts and Washington streets in 1891. That November, R. L. Darragfa & Co. was commissioned to construct a six-story structure on that site for $56,000. The building was completed in 1892 and was initially used as a warehouse. Within a decade, it was used for shoe manufacturing and wine making.

In the 1970s, the building was one of Tribeca's first commercial structures to be renovated into apartments. The New York City Landmarks Preservation Commission designated the building as a city landmark in 1978. The restaurateur Albert Capsouto and his brothers came across the Fleming Smith Warehouse's ground floor space in 1979 while looking for a place to open their restaurant. Though the site was still largely industrial at the time, the Capsouto brothers believed the site would be an ideal place for a restaurant. After placing a deposit on the ground-floor space, the brothers spent $250,000 completely renovating it into a restaurant, a process which took 18 months. These renovations involved replacing old warehouse openings with entrance doors, as well as creating a terrace out of a former loading dock. The brothers salvaged material from various locations, including wood from Harlem and Queens; a telephone booth that had been thrown out onto a street; and a mirror from Poughkeepsie, New York. This restaurant opened in 1980 as Capsouto Frères, and the Capsouto brothers had recouped their investment within a year, attributing the success to the building and site.

Capsouto Frères was closed permanently after Hurricane Sandy in 2012 flooded the ground floor, and the Capsouto Frères space was later placed for sale. A Chinese restaurant called China Blue, operated by the owners of Café China in Midtown Manhattan, leased the Capsouto Frères space in mid-2013. China Blue opened that December and operated until 2020, when it closed during the COVID-19 pandemic in New York City. The next year, David Litwak announced plans for a private social club, Maxwell Social, at the building. The club opened in mid-2023. After Maxwell Social opened, Tribeca residents claimed that the club had disrupted the "atmosphere" of the neighborhood.

== See also ==
- List of New York City Designated Landmarks in Manhattan below 14th Street
- National Register of Historic Places listings in Manhattan below 14th Street

== Sources ==
- Fleming Smith Warehouse (PDF) (Report). New York City Landmarks Preservation Commission. March 14, 1978.
- Historic Structure Report: Fleming Smith Warehouse (PDF) (Report). National Park Service. May 26, 1983.
