= Murray Hill Hotel (New York City) =

Demolished hotel in Manhattan, New York

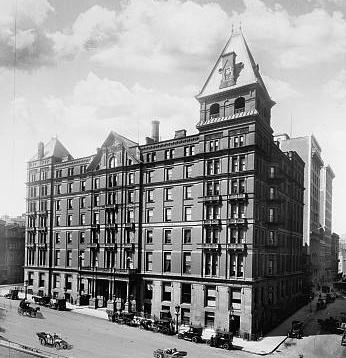

General information
- Status: Destroyed
- Location: 112 Park Avenue in Murray Hill, Manhattan, New York City
- Coordinates: 40°45′05″N 73°58′44″W
- Opened: 1884
- Demolished: 1947

Design and construction
- Architect: Stephen Decatur Hatch

Murray Hill Hotel was a hotel situated at 112 Park Avenue in Murray Hill, Manhattan, New York City. Built in 1884, with 600 rooms and two courtyards, it was demolished in 1947. It was part of the Bowman-Biltmore Hotels chain.

== Location ==
The building was constructed in Manhattan's Murray Hill neighborhood. It was located one block from the Grand Central Depot, two blocks from the Grand Central elevated station, and across the street from the line of Fourth Avenue coaches, that went directly to Post Office Square. In the opposite direction, Madison Avenue was a block away. The hotel fronted 200 feet (61 m) on Park Avenue, extending 230 feet (70 m) along 40th Street, and 230 feet (70 m) along 41st Street.

== History ==
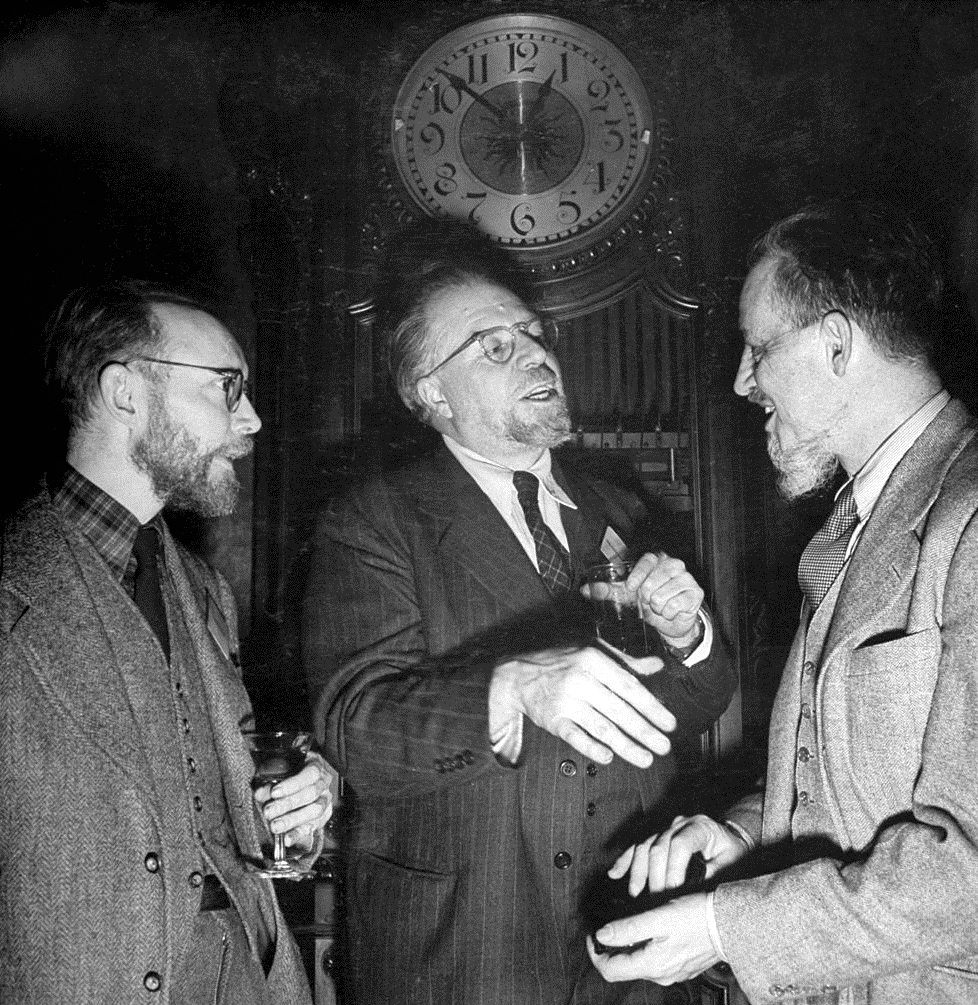
The Baker Street Irregulars — Fletcher Pratt, Christopher Morley and Rex Stout — at the Murray Hill Hotel (1944)

Built in 1884 by Hugh Smith, the architect was Stephen Decatur Hatch. Hunting & Hammond were the proprietors and were well known in the city. Nathan S. Hunting was identified with financial circles, being a member of the New York Stock Exchange. David I. Hammond was a popular hotel man with prior hotel management experience at the Hotel Bristol.

At a meeting held at the hotel on December 28, 1905, 62 higher-education institutions became charter members of the Intercollegiate Athletic Association of the United States, which was officially established the following year and became the National Collegiate Athletic Association in 1910.

In 1947, the Murray Hill Hotel was razed.

== Architecture and fittings ==
The seven-story building was of granite, brownstone and brick, and was fireproof. It contained 600 rooms and featured two courtyards.

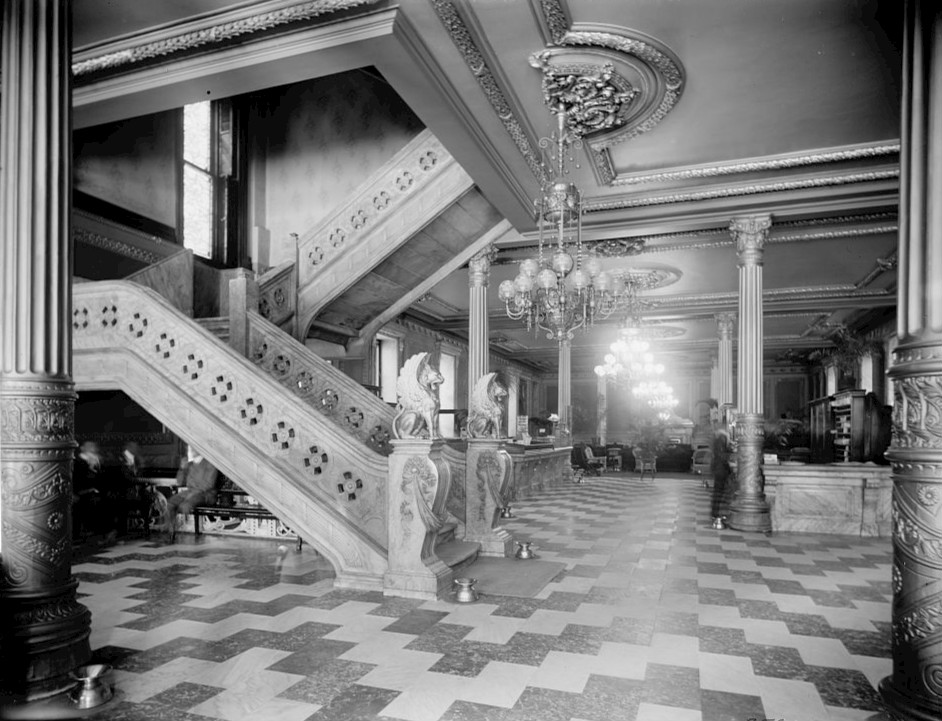
Office and foyer

The interior featured a vestibule and a short flight of marble stairs that lead to the office floor. The great hall had a high ceiling. The floor was of marble. The sienna was set against slate in a carpet pattern. The office area had a large counter where arriving guests could register. The book stand had access to several periodicals and newspapers. The great fireplace contained huge burning logs. The electric clock was lit at night, and the chandeliers illuminated halls and parlors, their supply of electricity generated from machines in the basement. The ice was made in huge condensers. Meals were ready at all hours. Restaurants above and below stairs were always open.

The building was advertised as being the only hotel in the city that was practically fire-proof in construction, stone, iron, and cement being used to the entire exclusion of wood in the walls, floors, staircases, and so on. In addition to its fire-proof qualities the safety of the house was ensured by the introduction of a most powerful complete water system, with tanks on the roof holding 14,000 gallons, and a hose room on each floor, so that absolute security from fire was guaranteed to the public. There were three main entrances to this building, with wide halls leading to the office rotunda, and the reception parlors and drawing-rooms, were decorated and furnished elaborately. The main dining hall was well lit, and with its adjoining smaller refreshment and tea rooms, afforded appropriate accommodation for the guests. Both a table d'hote and a restaurant a la carte were provided. The hotel contained numerous suites with parlors and connecting rooms. The furnishings were specially manufactured. Unvarying temperature was maintained throughout the vast structure both in winter and summer.

== Bibliography ==
- Edwards and Critten (1884). New York's great industries : exchange and commercial review, embracing also historical and descriptive sketch of the city, its leading merchants and manufacturers, with numerous illustrations (Public domain ed.). Historical Publishing Company.
- The Wheelman Company (1885). Outing. Vol. VI (Public domain ed.). Boston: The Wheelman Company.
