= Methodist Episcopal Church (Madison, New Jersey) =

Historic church in New Jersey, United States

- U.S. National Register of Historic Places
- New Jersey Register of Historic Places
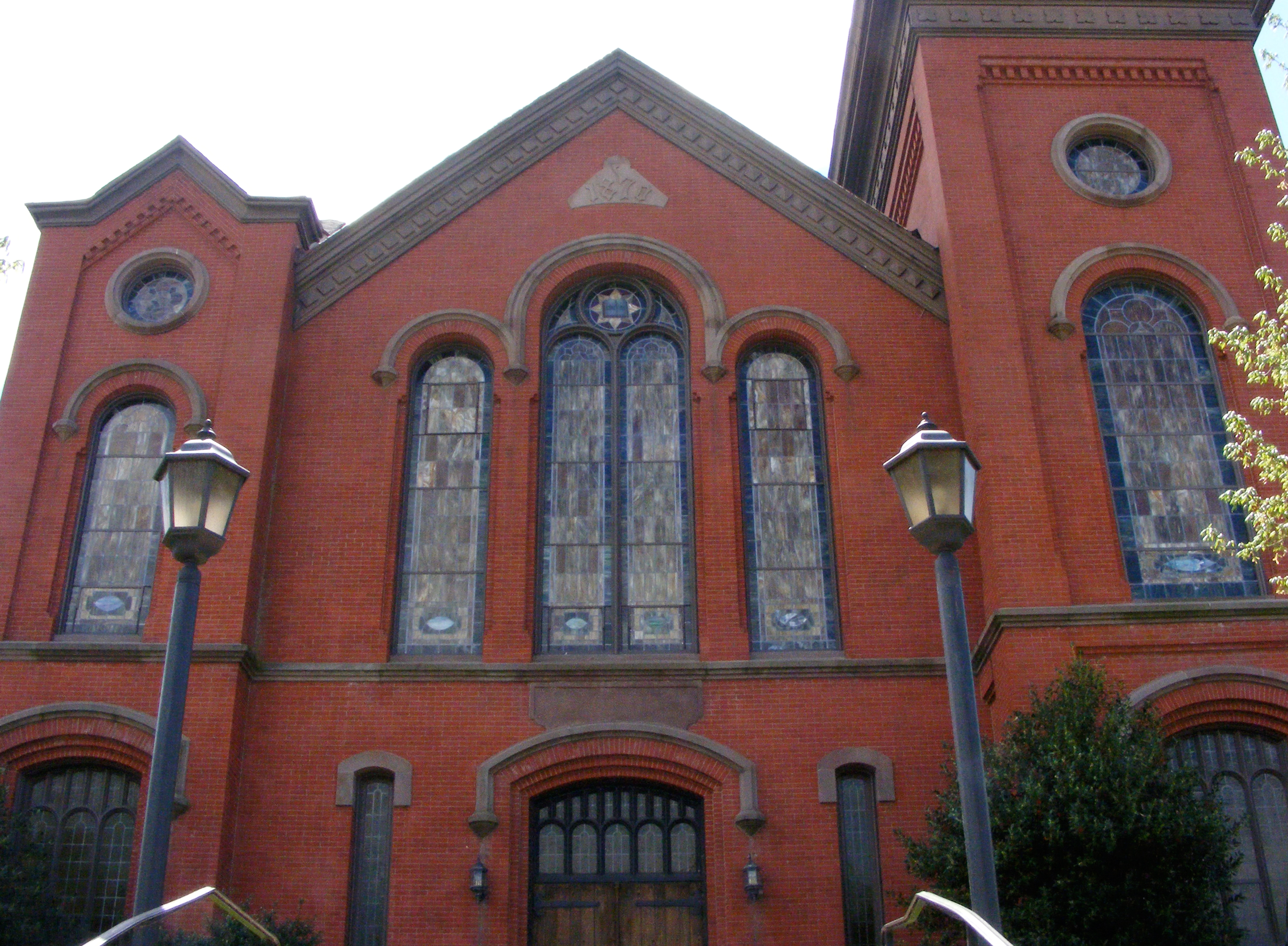
- The Outside Front Gate of Methodist Episcopal Church in Madison

- Location within Morris County, New Jersey Location within New Jersey Location within the United States
- Location: 24 Madison Avenue, Madison, New Jersey
- Coordinates: 40.76173°N 74.42058°W
- Area: 1 acre (0.40 ha)
- Built: 1870
- Architect: Hatch, Stephen Decatur; Parcels, Ellis
- Architectural style: Romanesque
- NRHP reference No.: 08000364
- NJRHP No.: 4433

Significant dates
- Added to NRHP: May 02, 2008
- Designated NJRHP: January 25, 2008

Methodist Episcopal Church, currently known as the United Methodist Church in Madison, is a historic church at 24, Madison Avenue in Madison, Morris County, New Jersey, United States.

United Methodist Church in Madison is following the belief of Methodism, which is originated from Church of England.

Their mission statement:"Inspired by the life and teachings of Jesus, we welcome all to be nourished for life's journey through worship, community, and service".

Although the congregation was formed in 1843, the current Romanesque architecture was built in 1870, by Stephen Decatur Hatch. It was added to the National Register in 2008.

History: After several relocations around Madison, property was given to the Methodists by Daniel Drew located next to the Drew University Campus in 1867. This would become the new location of the church and parsonage. Later the church was dedicated in 1871. In the following years, the church was remodeled and a chapel was added in 1890.

Architecture: Methodist Episcopal church's wall is decorated with stained glass, an ornament used in western buildings for generating radiant lights due to light reflection.

Although the congregation was formed in 1843, the current Romanesque architecture was built in 1870 by Stephen Decatur Hatch. It was added to the National Register in 2008.

Inside of the Church: Pipe Organ, a keyboard instrument of one or more pipe divisions or other means for producing tones.

Activities Around the Church:

Madison Farmer Market, sponsored by the Madison Urban Development Commission, sells fresh produce each year. And Madison May Day is a labor Day dedicated to the city.
