= Gilsey House =

Building in Manhattan, New York

- Gilsey House Hotel
- U.S. National Register of Historic Places
- New York State Register of Historic Places
- New York City Landmark
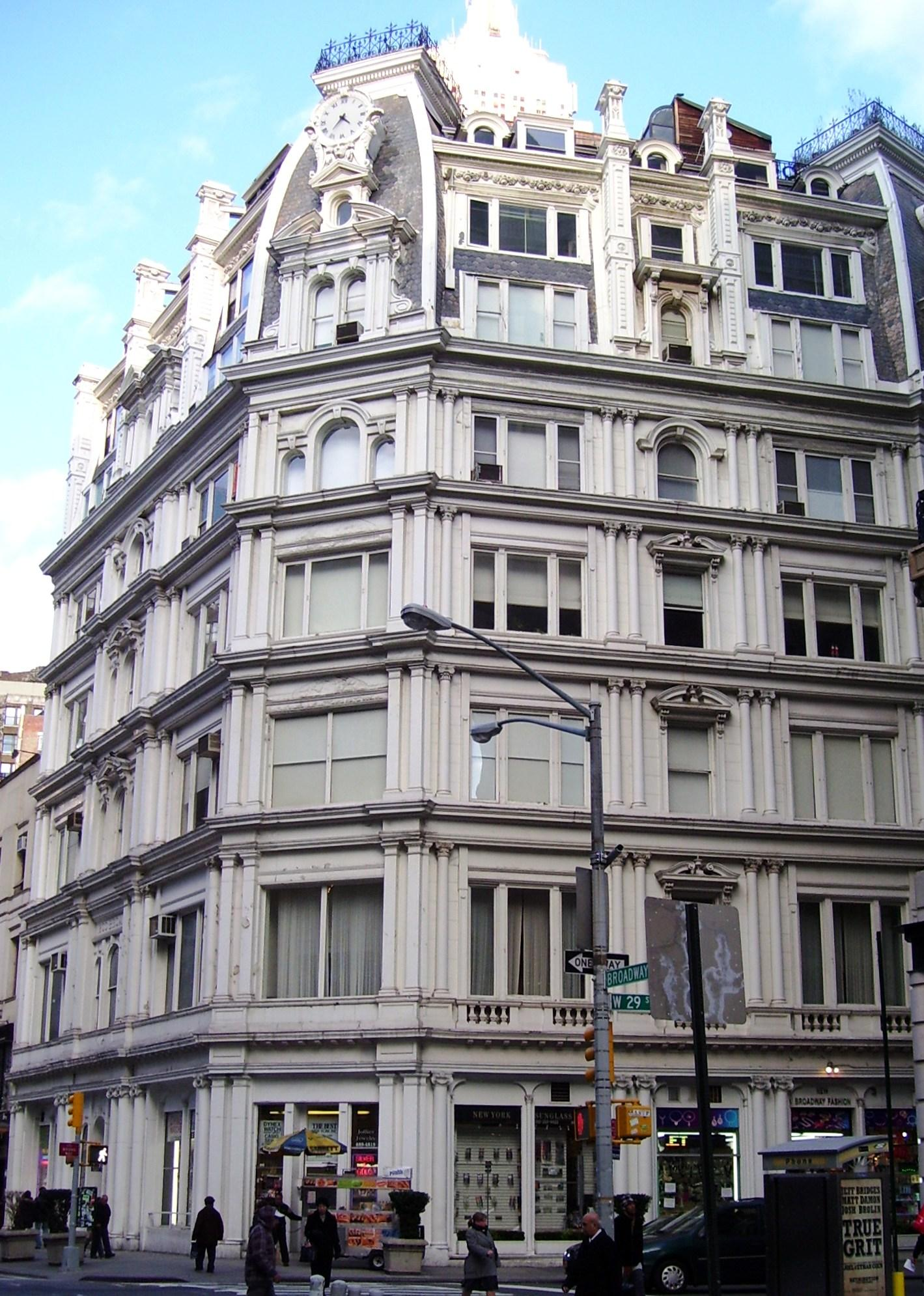
- a view from down Broadway (2010)
- Location: 1200 Broadway, Manhattan, New York City
- Coordinates: 40°44′46″N 73°59′18″W
- Built: 1869-1871
- Architect: Stephen Decatur Hatch
- Architectural style: Second Empire
- NRHP reference No.: 78001872
- NYSRHP No.: 06101.000555
- NYCL No.: 1039

Significant dates
- Added to NRHP: December 14, 1978
- Designated NYSRHP: June 23, 1980
- Designated NYCL: September 11, 1979

Gilsey House is an eight-story, 300-room former hotel at 1200 Broadway at West 29th Street in the NoMad neighborhood of Manhattan, New York City. It is a New York City landmark and on the National Register of Historic Places.

== History ==
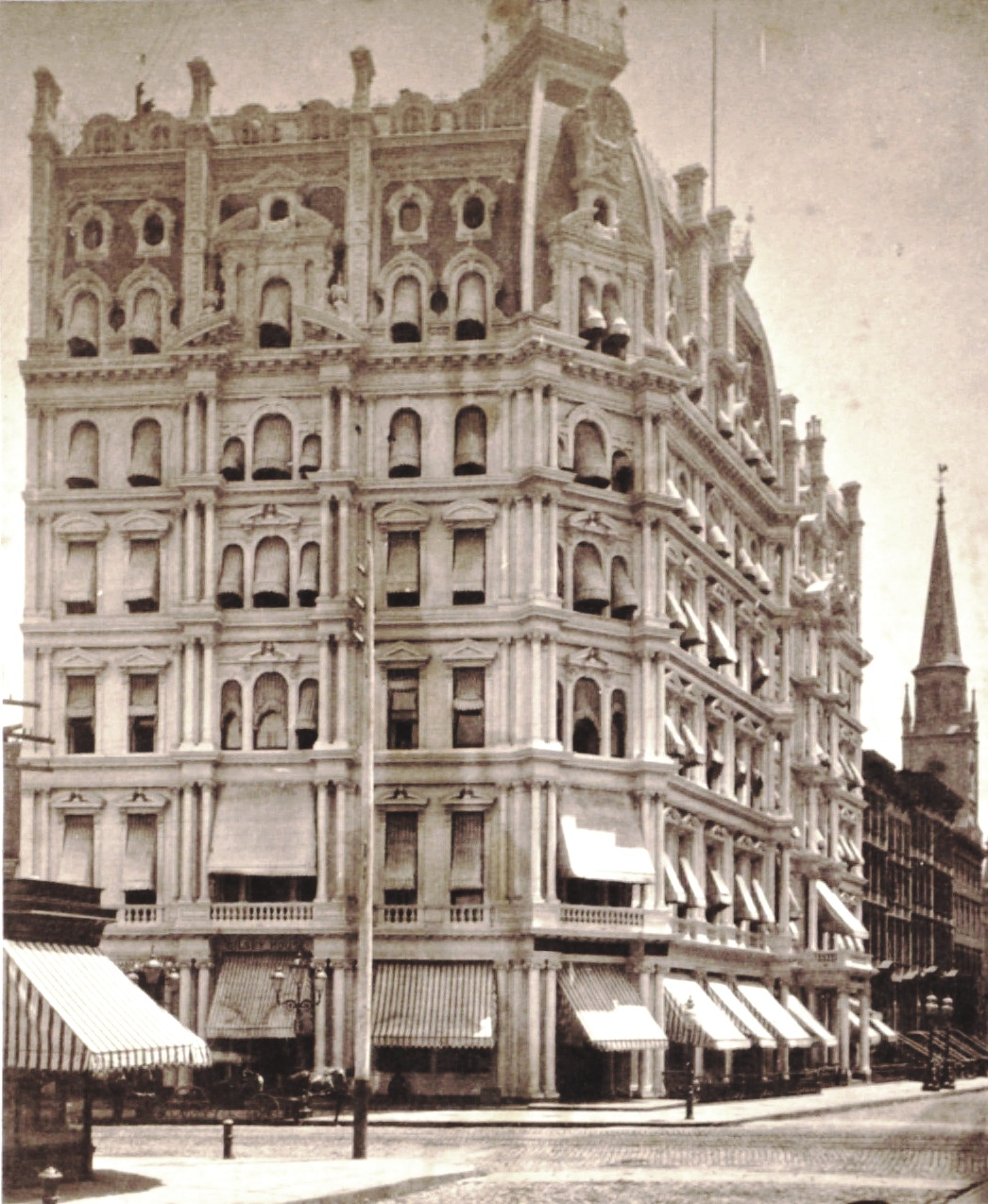
Gilsey House from 29th Street, taken from a stereoscopic view (prior to 1900)

Gilsey House was designed by Stephen Decatur Hatch for Peter Gilsey, a Danish immigrant merchant and city alderman who leased the plot – which included the grounds of the St George's Cricket Club – from Caspar Samlar for $10,000 a year. It was constructed from 1869 to 1871 at the cost of $350,000, opening as the Gilsey House Hotel in 1872. The cast iron for the facade of the Second Empire style building was fabricated by Daniel D. Badger, a significant and influential advocate for cast-iron architecture at the time; the extent to which Badger contributed to the design of the facade is unknown.

The hotel was luxurious – the rooms featured rosewood and walnut finishing, marble fireplace mantles, bronze chandeliers and tapestries – and offered services to its guests such as telephones, the first hotel in New York to do so. It was a favorite of Diamond Jim Brady, Aimée Crocker and Oscar Wilde, Samuel Clemens was a guest, and it attracted the theatrical trade at a time when the area – which became known as the "Tenderloin" – was becoming the primary entertainment and amusement district for New York's growing population, with numerous theatres, gambling clubs and brothels.

Gilsey House closed in 1911 after legal conflict beginning in 1904 between the operator of the hotel, Seaboard Hotel Company, and the Gilsey estate over the terms of the lease. Parts of the facade, such as cast-iron columns, which went over the property line were removed, and the building deteriorated, with rust, water damage and sagging floors. In 1925, plans were filed to rebuild the structure as an ordinary loft building of brick and stone, but were never carried out, although the ground-level storefronts were modernized in 1946. The building's future was decided when it was purchased in 1980 by Richard Berry and F. Anthony Zunino and converted into co-operative apartments after a cosmetic cleanup of the exterior, which won a commendation from the Friends of Cast Iron Architecture. The facade was finally almost fully restored in 1992 by Building Conservation Associates.

The building, with its "extraordinary" three-story mansard roof and its "vigor that only the waning years of the 19th century could muster" was added to the National Register of Historic Places in 1978. It was designated a New York City landmark in 1979.

== See also ==
- National Register of Historic Places listings in Manhattan from 14th to 59th Streets
- List of New York City Designated Landmarks in Manhattan from 14th to 59th Streets
