= Stephen Decatur Hatch =

American architect

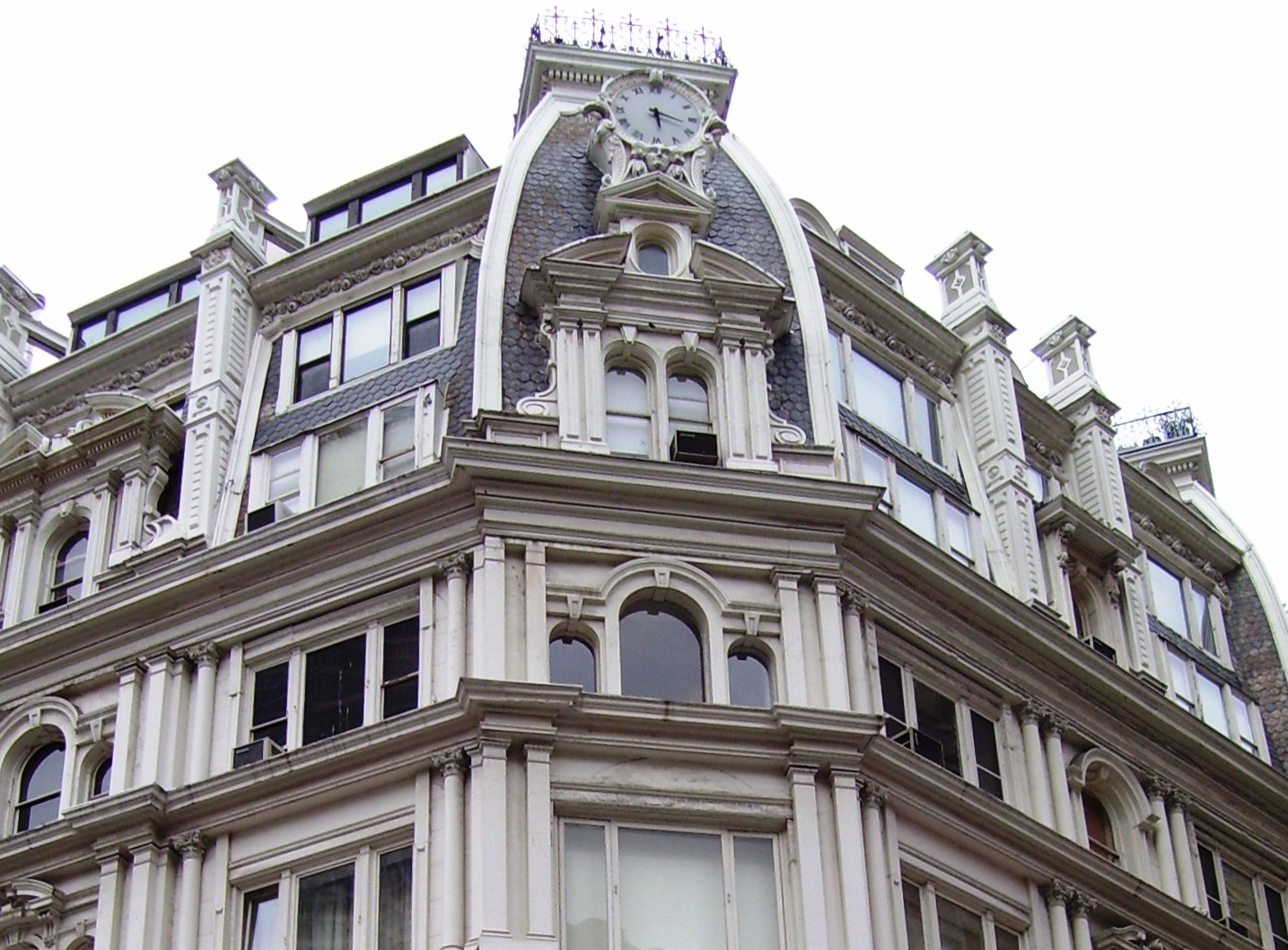
Part of Hatch's three-story mansard roof for Gilsey House

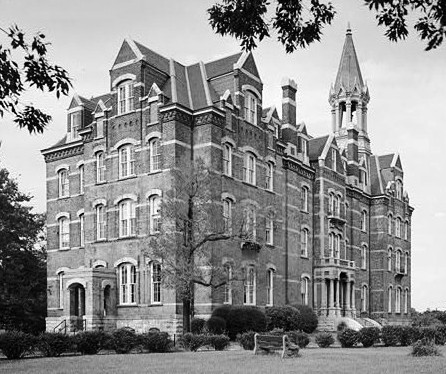
Jubilee Hall at Fisk University

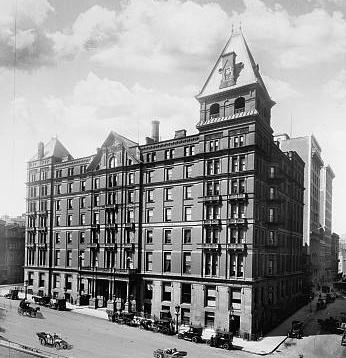
Murray Hill Hotel, built 1884, razed 1947 (c.1900-1910)

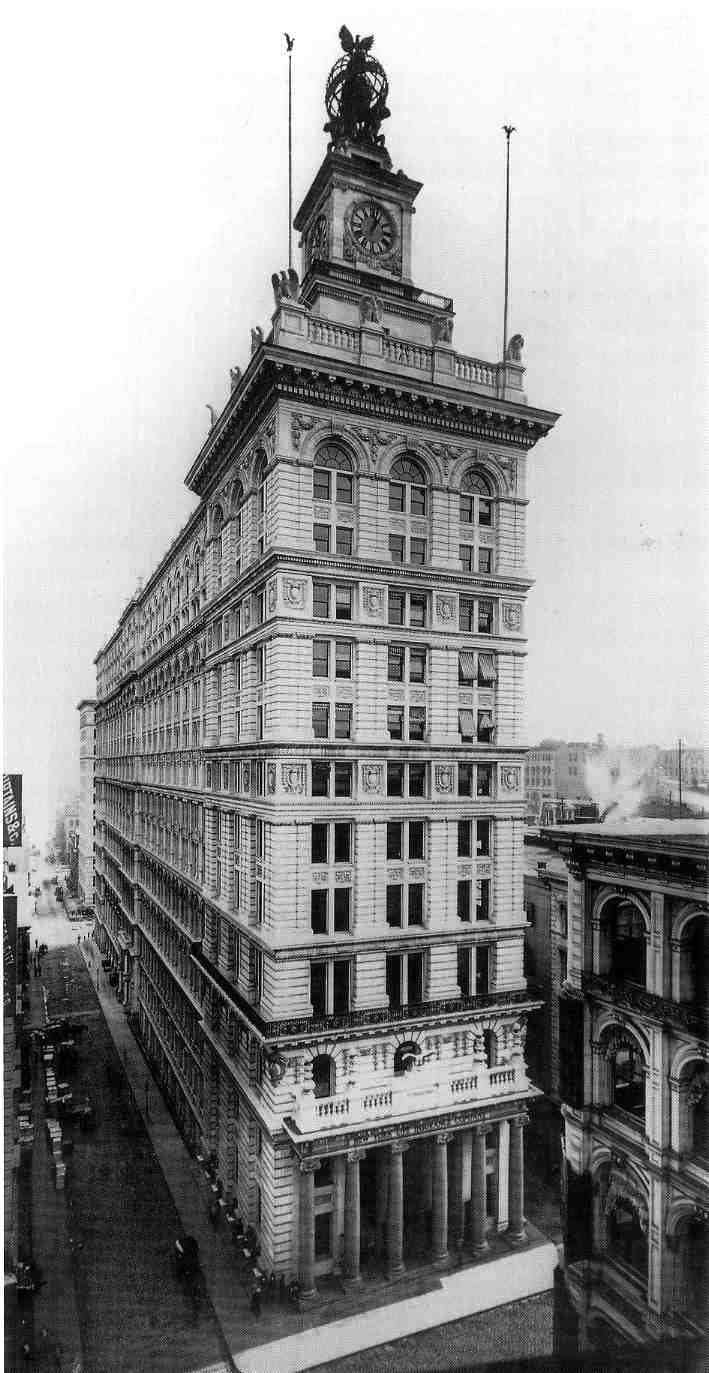
The former New York Life Insurance Company Building

Stephen Decatur Hatch (1839–1894) was an American architect known for his buildings in Manhattan, New York City. He primarily designed commercial buildings.

== Early life, family and education ==
Hatch was born in Swanton, Vermont. His father was an inventor.

== Career ==
Hatch relocated to New York City, finding employment as a construction inspector. He joined the busy architectural firm of John B. Snook in 1860 as a draftsman.

Hatch left the Snook firm around 1864 to start his own practice. He became the architect of the U.S. War Department, responsible for construction of military posts in New York. His practice began to flourish in 1868.

== Personal life and demise ==
Hatch died in 1894, during the construction of an extension to the headquarters building of the New York Life Insurance Company.

== Works ==
Manhattan

- 213-215 Water Street – warehouse, built 1868 for A.A. Thompson & Co., now part of South Street Seaport Museum, within the South Street Seaport Historic District
- 118 East 18th Street – built 1868
- Gilsey House Hotel – 1200 Broadway, built 1869–1871, converted to residential use 1980, a New York City landmark (1979)
- 836-838 Broadway – built 1876-1877
- Robbins & Appleton Building – manufacturing, built 1879–1880, a New York City landmark (1979)
- Schepp Building – warehouse, 45-53 Hudson Street, built 1880, within the Tribeca North Historic District
- 165 Duane Street – lofts, built 1881, within the Tribeca West Historic District
- Murray Hill Hotel – Park Avenue between 40th and 41st Streets, built 1884, razed 1947
- U.S. Army Building – also known as 3 New York Plaza, Water & Whitehall Streets, offices, built 1886
- 168 Duane Street – warehouse, built 1886–1887, within the Tribeca West Historic District, Dutch Revival style
- Manhattan Savings Institution – also known as Bleecker Tower, 644 Broadway, built 1889–1891, within the NoHo Historic District
- Fleming Smith Warehouse – 451-453 Washington Street, built 1891–1892, a New York City landmark (1978)
- Roosevelt Building – lofts, 839-841 Broadway, built 1893
- Former New York Life Insurance Company Building – also known as the Clock Tower Building, offices, 346 Broadway, built 1894–1895, completed by McKim, Mead & White, a New York City landmark (1987) and on the National Register of Historic Places (1982)
- United States Custom House (now the Federal Hall National Memorial) and the American Surety Building, both located in lower Manhattan.

Elsewhere

- Methodist Episcopal Church – Madison, New Jersey, built 1870, on the National Register of Historic Places (2008)
- Jubilee Hall – Fisk University, Nashville, Tennessee, built 1876, a National Historic Landmark (1974)
- Laclede Building – St. Louis, Missouri, built 1888
- Eisenhower Executive Office Building, Rooms 231 & 232 – Washington, D.C., office suite for the U.S. Secretary of War, completed March 1888
- Designed State Capitol building in Providence, Rhode Island.
